= Stobbs =

Stobbs is a surname of Northern English origin. Famous people with the surname Stobbs include:

- Alex Stobbs, musician with cystic fibrosis
- Chuck Stobbs (1929–2008), Major League Baseball pitcher
- George R. Stobbs (1877–1966), Representative from Massachusetts
- Harry Stobbs (1932–1978), Agricultural Scientist in Australia, a Memorial Lecture is dedicated to him
- Richard Stobbs, the former Republican Sheriff of Belmont County, Ohio
- T. W. Stobbs, American football coach, head coach at Wittenberg University, 1929–1941
- William Stobbs (1914–2000), author and illustrator
