= Montpelier Hill =

Hill in County Dublin, Ireland

- Slieve Gorra
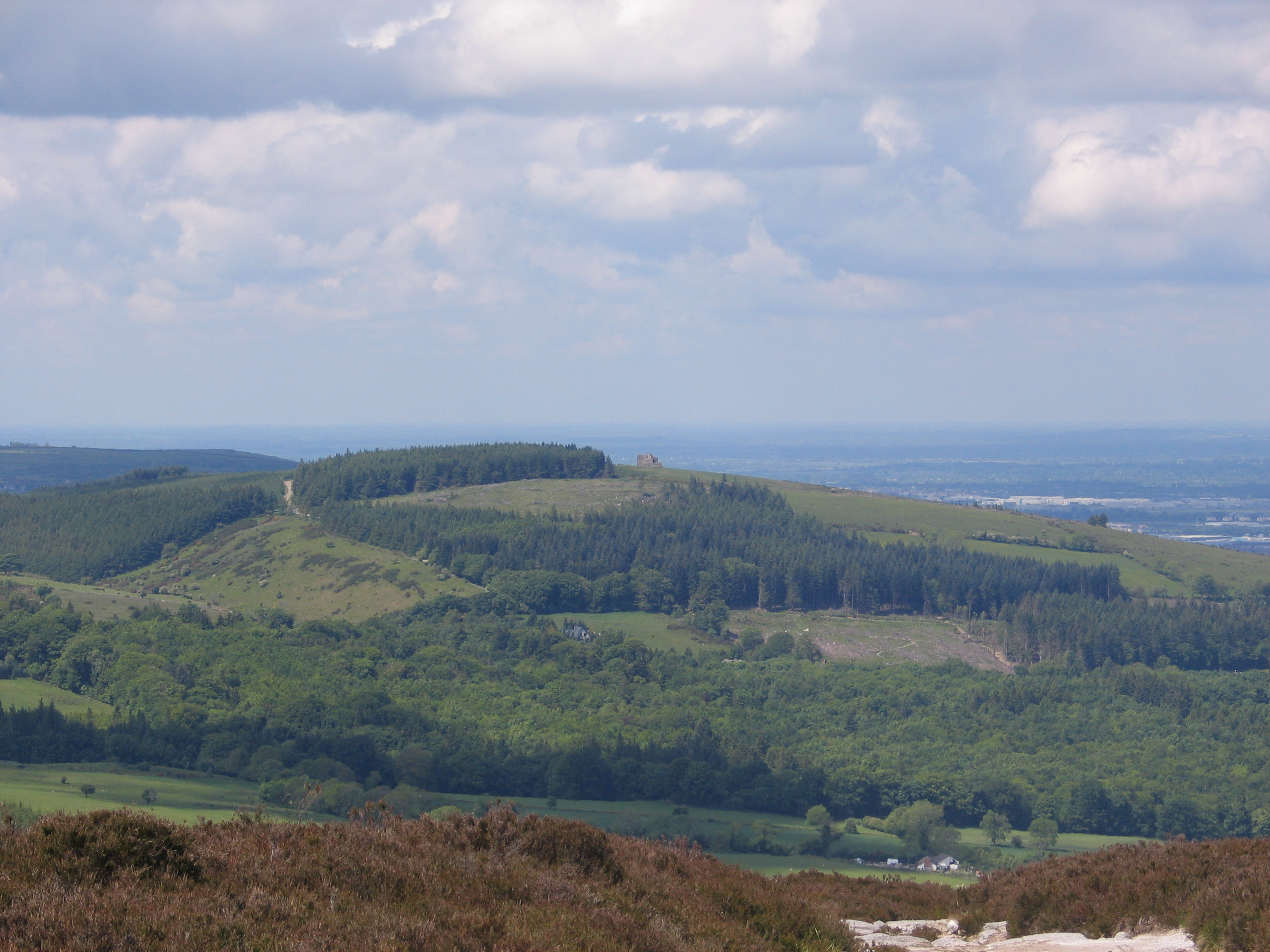

Highest point
- Elevation: 383 m (1,257 ft)
- Coordinates: 53°15′6.7″N 6°19′49.24″W

Geography
- Location within island of Ireland
- Location: County Dublin, Ireland
- Parent range: Wicklow Mountains
- OSI/OSNI grid: O120238
- Topo map: OSI Discovery No. 50

Montpelier Hill or Mountpelier, also known as Slieve Gorra, is a hill in County Dublin, Ireland, with a height of 383 metres (1,257 ft). It is at the northern edge of the Wicklow Mountains and overlooks Dublin city. On its summit is an infamous ruined sporting lodge known as the Hell Fire Club.

There are two flattened prehistoric passage tombs on the summit. Around 1725, stones from these tombs were used to build a sporting lodge for Anglo-Irish politician William Conolly. The lodge was used by the Dublin Hellfire Club, a private club for upper class young men who reportedly engaged in debauchery, occult activities, and ritual murder. The building has since become associated with the paranormal and is reputedly haunted.

Montpelier Hill is popular for hillwalking. On the slopes is a forestry plantation, known as Hell Fire Wood, which consists of Sitka spruce, larch and beech. The hill and much of the surrounding lands are owned by the state forestry company Coillte and are open to the public. At the eastern foot of the hill are the ruins of Killakee Estate, the former country estate of the Massy family, and the Stewards House. To the west, the hill overlooks the Glenasmole valley.

== Name ==
The hill is also known as Slieve Gorra, which derives from Irish. The modern English name Mountpelier or Montpelier Hill comes from Mount Pelier House, a now-ruined Anglo-Irish country house on the northern slope of the hill.

The historian and archaeologist Patrick Healy has suggested that the hill is the place known as Suide Uí Ceallaigh or Suidi Celi in the Crede Mihi, the twelfth-century diocesan register book of the Archbishops of Dublin.

== Prehistoric monuments ==
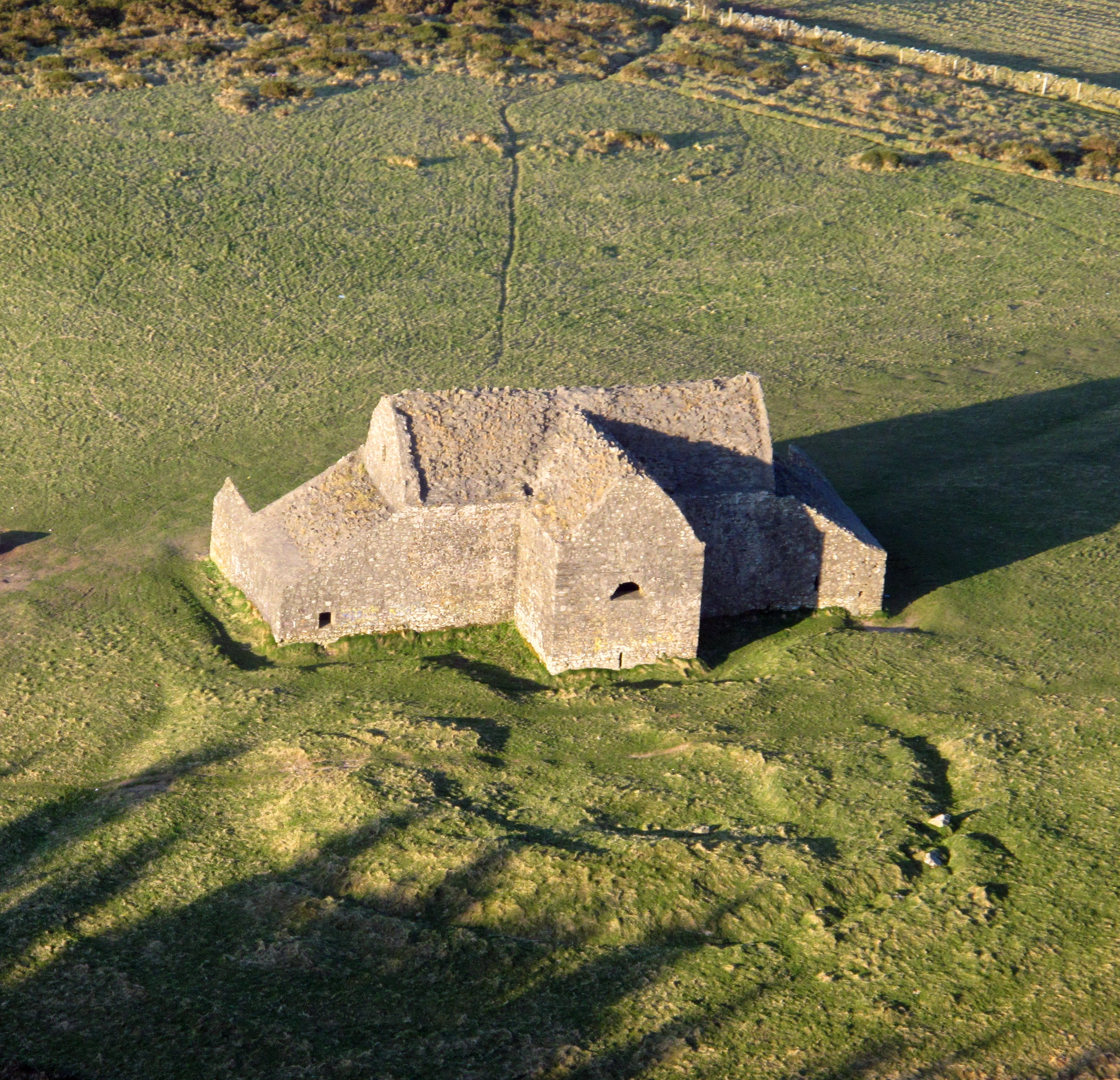
Aeriel view showing the circular outline of the former megalithic tomb, below the ruined Hell Fire Club building

The remains of the prehistoric monument that originally stood at the summit can be seen to the rear of the Hell Fire Club building. Austin Cooper, on his visit in 1779, described it thus: "behind the house are still the remains of the cairn, the limits of which were composed of large stones set edgeways which made a sort of wall or boundary about 18 inches (46 centimetres) high and withinside these were the small stones heaped up. It is 34 yards (31 metres) diameter or 102 yards (93 metres) in circumference. In the very centre is a large stone 9 feet (2.7 metres) long and 6 feet (1.8 metres) broad and about 3 feet (0.91 metres) thick not raised upon large stones but lying low with the stones cleared away from about it. There are several other large stones lying upon the heap." It appears from this description that the central chamber of the monument – which was a passage grave – survived intact even after Mount Pelier was constructed. The historian Peter J. O'Keefe has suggested that many of the stones were taken away and used in the construction of the Military Road at the start of the nineteenth century. Today, all that remains is a circular mound 15 metres (49 feet) in diameter and up to 2 metres (6.6 feet) high with a dip at the centre where the chamber was located. The four large stones at the edge are all that survive of the kerbstones that formed the boundary of the monument. In close proximity is a second mound, 1 metre (3.3 feet) high, on which an Ordnance Survey trig pillar stands. Close to the monument is a fallen standing stone, a pointed rock 1 metre (3.3 feet) high.

However, in October 2016 a further excavation discovered a huge passage grave similar to that at Newgrange, probably dating back 5,000 years, under the ruins.

== The Hell Fire Club ==
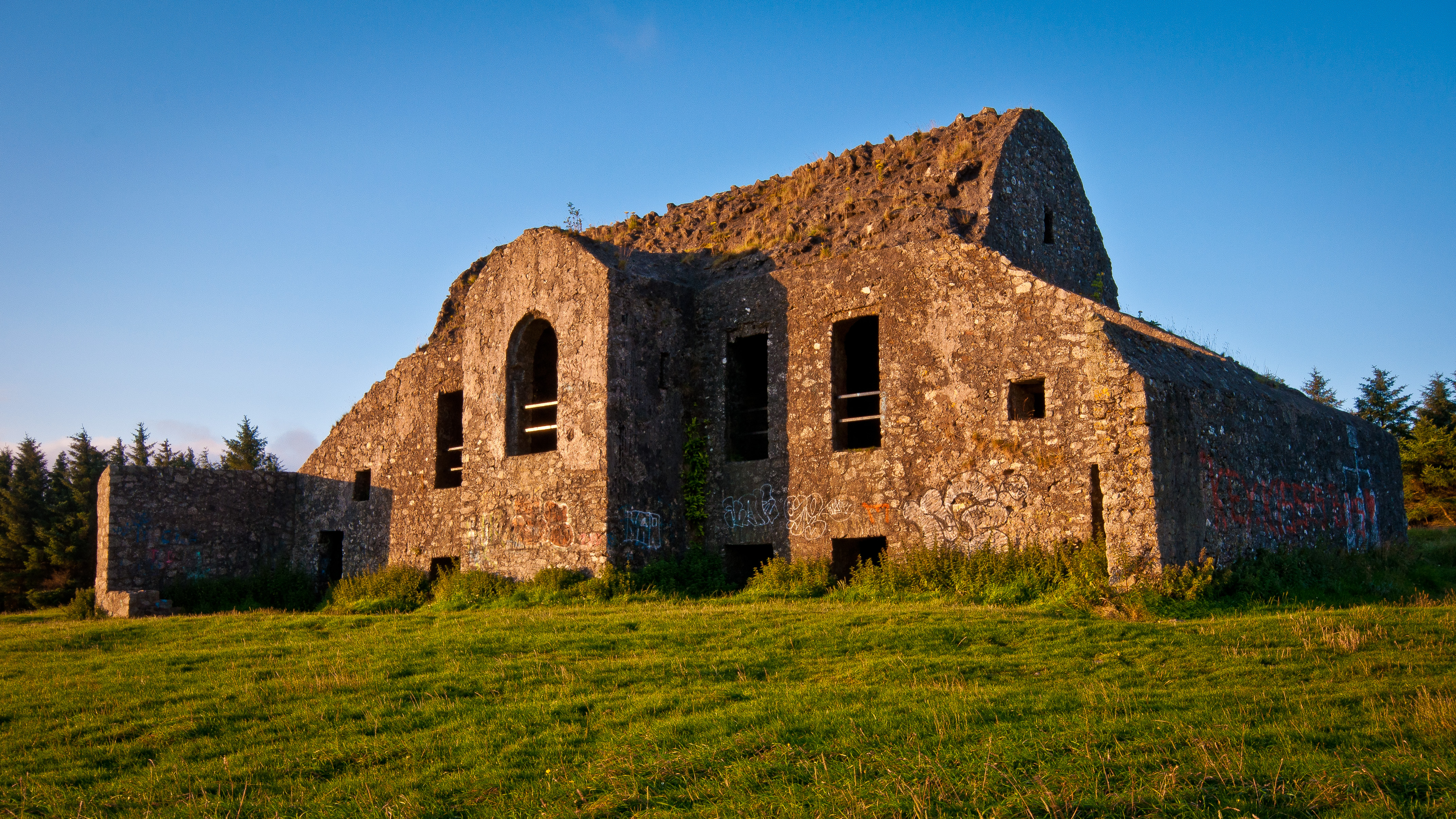
The Hell Fire Club at dawn

=== William Conolly's Hunting Lodge ===
The building now known as the Hell Fire Club (Irish: Club Thine Ifreann) was built around 1725 as a hunting lodge by William Conolly, the Speaker of the Irish House of Commons. Over the years it came to be known as "The Shooting Lodge", "The Kennel", "Conolly's Folly", 'The Brass Castle' and "The Haunted House". The building and hill were also nicknamed 'Bevan's Hill'.

While the building has a rough appearance today, the architecture is of a Palladian design. The upper floor consists of a hall and two reception rooms. On the eastern side, there was a third, timber-floored, level where the sleeping quarters were located. On the ground floor are a kitchen, servants' quarters and stairs to the upper floors. The entrance, which is on the upper floor, was reached by a long flight of stairs which is now missing. At each side of the building is a room with a lean-to roof which may have been used to stable horses. A stone mounting block to assist people onto their horses can be seen on the eastern side. To the front there was a semi-circular courtyard, enclosed by a low stone wall and entered by a gate. The house faces to the north, looking over Dublin and the plains of counties Meath and Kildare, including Conolly's primary residence at Castletown House in Celbridge. The grounds around the lodge consisted of a 1,000-acre (4.0 km^{2}; 1.6 sq mi) deer park. The identity of the architect is unknown: the author Michael Fewer has suggested it may have been Edward Lovett Pearce (1699–1733) who was employed by Conolly to carry out works at Castletown in 1724.

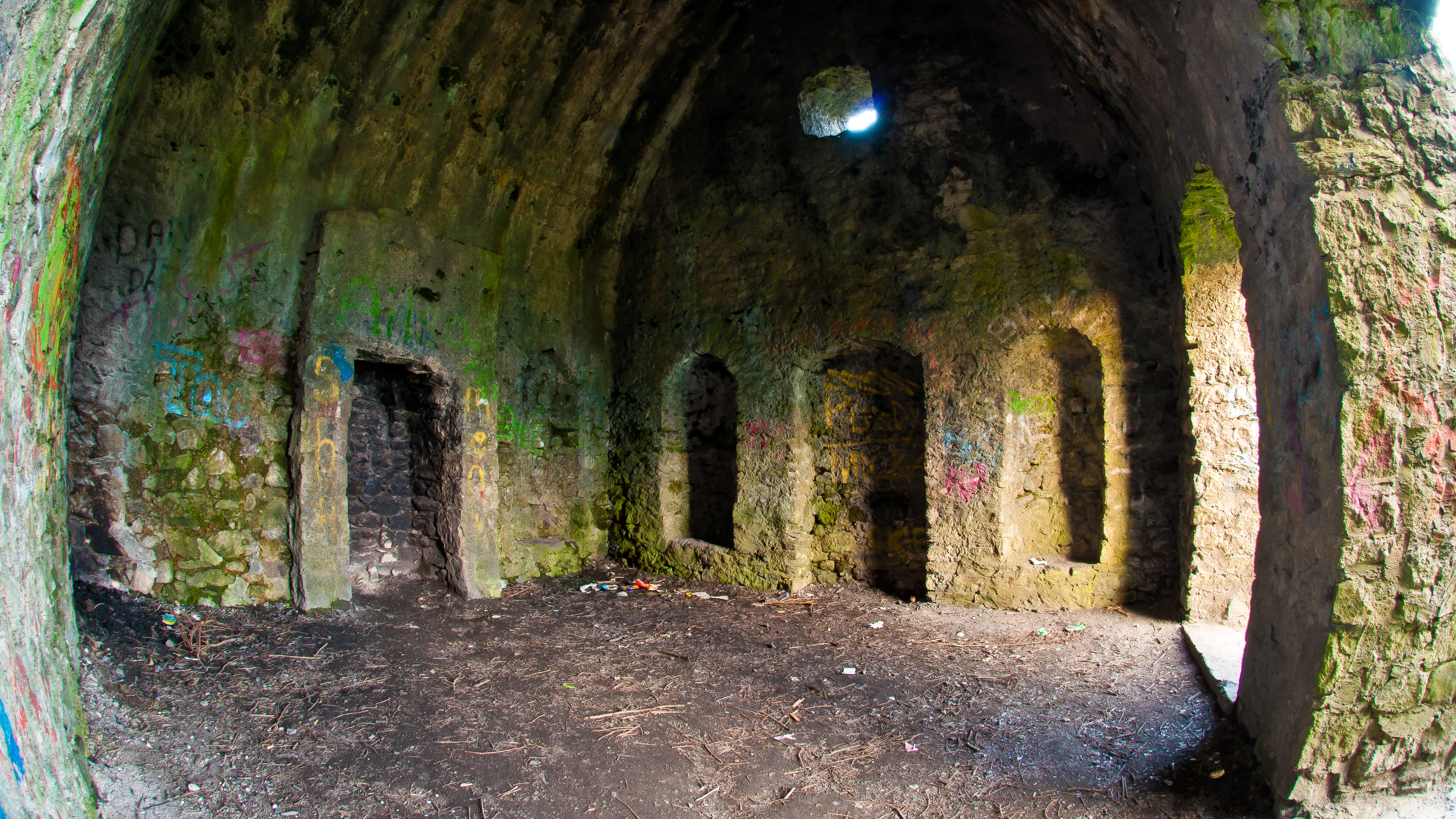
Fisheye image of one of the reception rooms on the upper floor

There was a prehistoric burial site at the summit of Mount Pelier Hill and stones from it were used in the construction of the lodge. A nearby standing stone was also used for the lintel over the fireplace. Shortly after its completion, a great storm blew the original slate roof off. Local superstition held that this was the work of the Devil, an act of revenge for disturbing the ancient cairn. Conolly had the roof replaced with an arched stone roof constructed in a similar fashion to that of a bridge. This roof has remained intact to the present day, even though the building has been abandoned for over two centuries and despite the roof being set alight with tar barrels during the visit of Queen Victoria to Ireland in 1849. There is little evidence that the lodge was put to much use. Conolly himself died in 1729.

=== History of the Dublin Hellfire Club ===
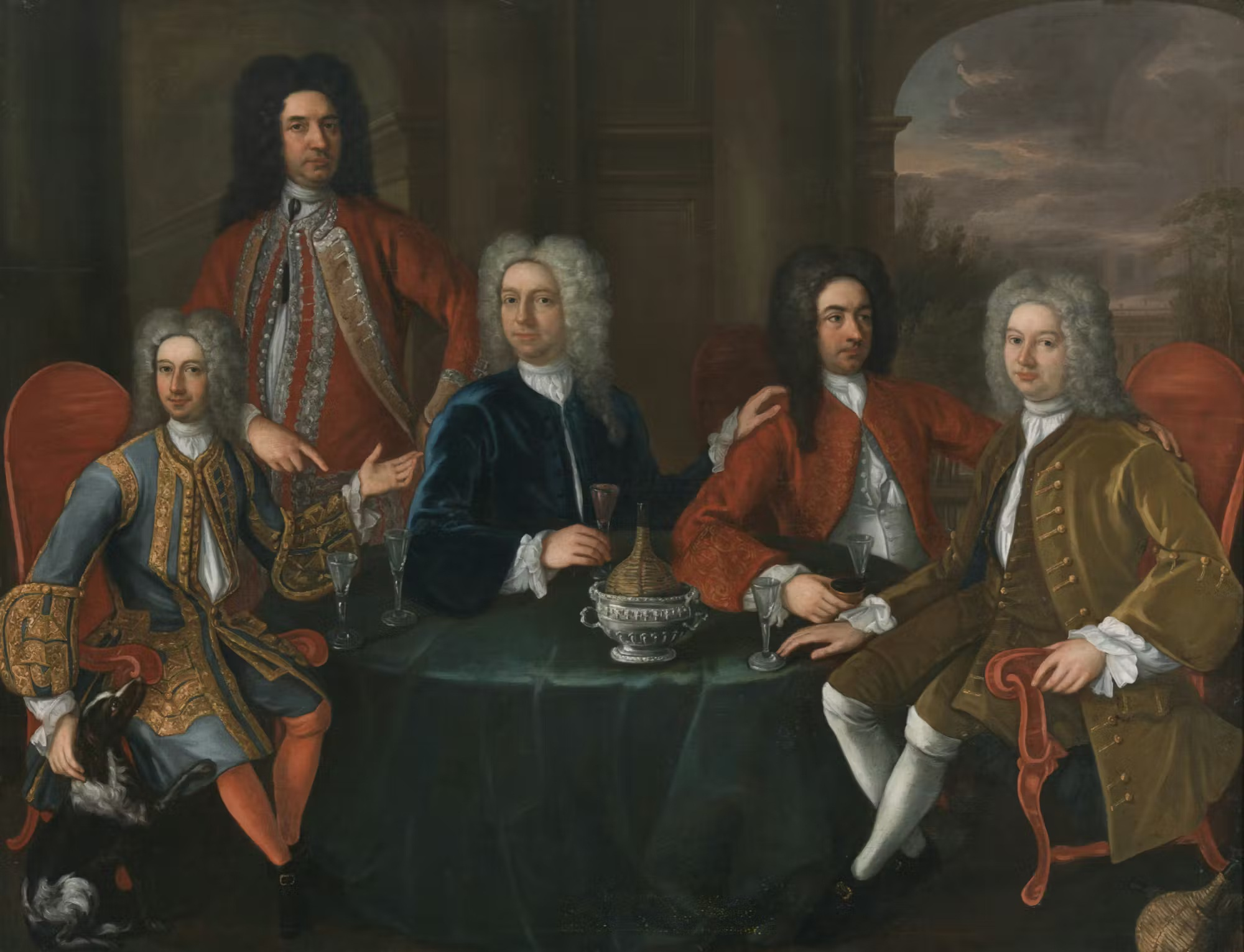
c. 1735 painting of the Dublin Hellfire Club's members

The Irish Hell Fire Club was founded around 1737 by Richard Parsons, 1st Earl of Rosse, and James Worsdale. It was one of several elite secret societies referred to as Hellfire Clubs that existed in Britain and Ireland in the 18th century. Lord Rosse was probably the president of the club. Evidence of the identities of other members comes from a painting by Worsdale entitled The Hell Fire Club, Dublin, now held by the National Gallery of Ireland, which shows five members of the club seated around a table. The five men are Henry, 4th Baron Barry of Santry (who was tried for murder and convicted in 1739); Simon Luttrell, Lord Irnham; Colonel Henry Ponsonby; Colonel Richard St George and Colonel Clements. Most of their meetings occurred in Dublin city centre at the Eagle Tavern on Cork Hill, near Dublin Castle. Accounts of the club's meetings claim that members drank "scaltheen", a mixture of whiskey and hot butter, and that they left a chair vacant at each gathering for the Devil. The club's mascot was a black cat.

At some stage, the lodge at Mount Pelier was let to the club by the Conolly family (coincidentally, William Conolly had purchased Mount Pelier Hill from Philip, Duke of Wharton, founder of the first Hell Fire Club in 1719.).

It is not clear to what extent, if any, the Hell Fire Club made use of the building. The author Michael Fewer has suggested that the remoteness of Mount Pelier's location is why there are almost no verifiable accounts of the activities that went on there. However, numerous stories surrounding the building have become part of local folklore, some of which have spread to a wider audience through publication in the nineteenth century in books such as Robert Chambers' Book of Days (1864) and in The Gentleman's Magazine (1731–1922).

One of the best-known of these tells of a stranger who arrived at the club on a stormy night. Invited in, he joined the members in a card game. One player dropped his card on the floor and when he bent under the table to retrieve it noticed that the stranger had a cloven hoof. At this point, the visitor disappeared in a ball of flame. This story, which is found in texts from at least the 1930s, is very similar to one associated with Loftus Hall, County Wexford. The Loftus family owned a hunting lodge – known as Dolly Mount – which was also to be found on Mount Pelier Hill.

Another story tells of a priest who came to the house one night and found the members engaged in the sacrifice of a black cat. The priest grabbed the cat and uttered an exorcism upon which a demon was released from the corpse of the cat.

One tale centres on club member Simon Luttrell, Lord Irnham, later Earl of Carhampton, one time Sheriff of Dublin. Luttrell is believed to have been the subject of The Diaboliad, a 1777 poem dedicated to "the worst man in England". According to the story, Luttrell made a pact with the Devil to give up his soul within seven years in return for settling his debts but, when the Devil came to Mount Pelier lodge to claim his prize, Luttrell distracted the Devil and fled.

Other tales recount numerous drinking sessions and black masses at which animal sacrifices, and on one occasion the sacrifice of a dwarf took place.

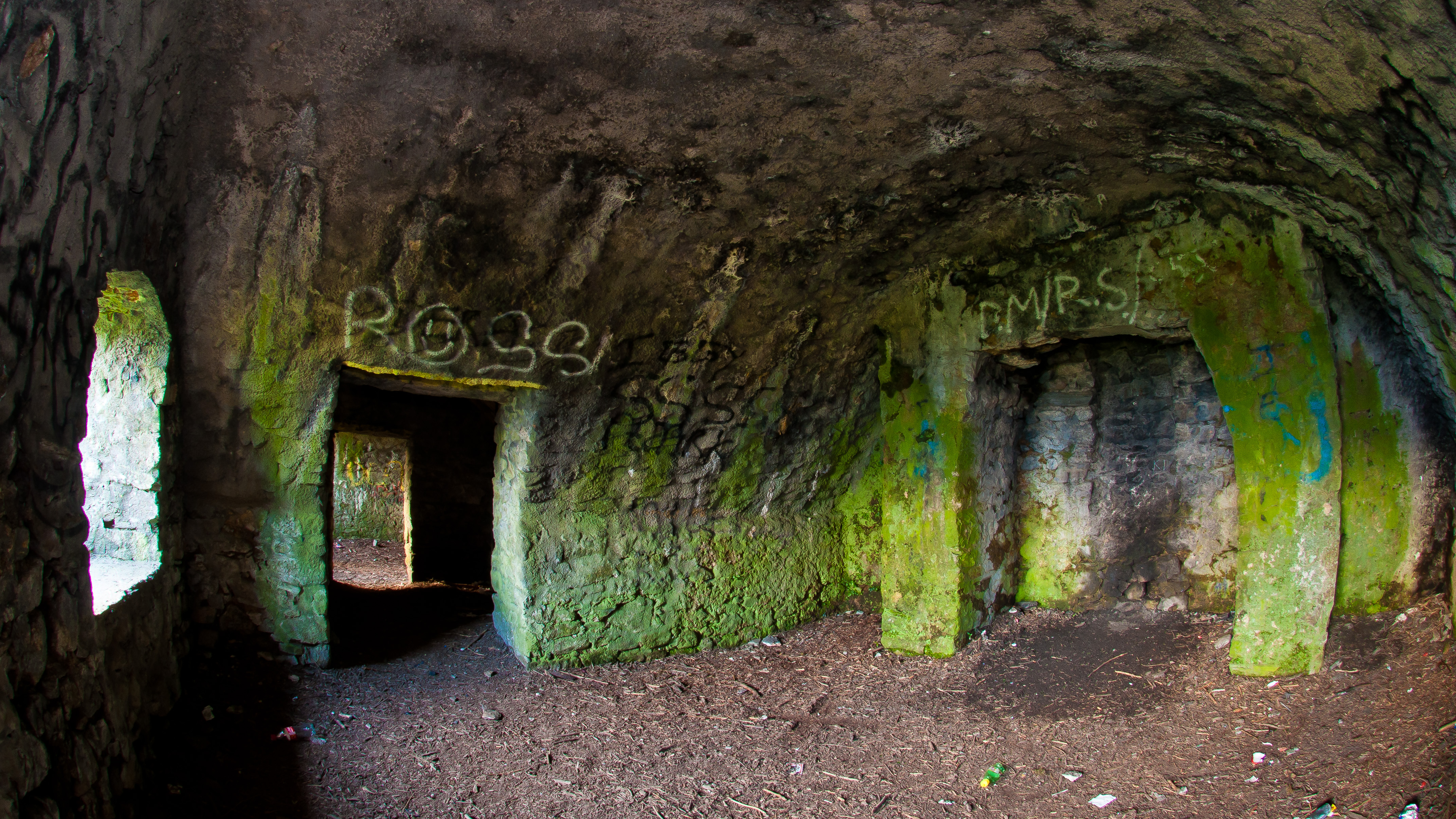
Fisheye image of the kitchen on the lower floor

At some point during this period, the building was damaged by fire. There are several stories connected with this incident. One holds that the club set fire to the building when William Conolly's son refused to renew the lease on the lodge. An alternative story claims the club members did it to give the building a hellish appearance. Another story recounts that, following a black mass, a footman spilled a drink on "Burn-Chapel" Whaley's coat. Whaley retaliated by pouring brandy over the man and setting him alight. The fire spread around the building and killed many members. Following the fire, the club relocated further down the hill to Killakee Stewards House. However, the club's activities declined after this incident.

The Irish Hell Fire Club was revived in 1771 and was active for a further 30 years. Its most notorious member was Thomas "Buck" Whaley, son of Richard Chappell Whaley. This new incarnation was known as "The Holy Fathers". Meetings once again took place at Mount Pelier lodge and, according to one story, the members kidnapped, murdered and ate a farmer's daughter. Whaley eventually repented and, when he died in 1800, the Irish Hell Fire Club disbanded with his death.

=== Later history ===
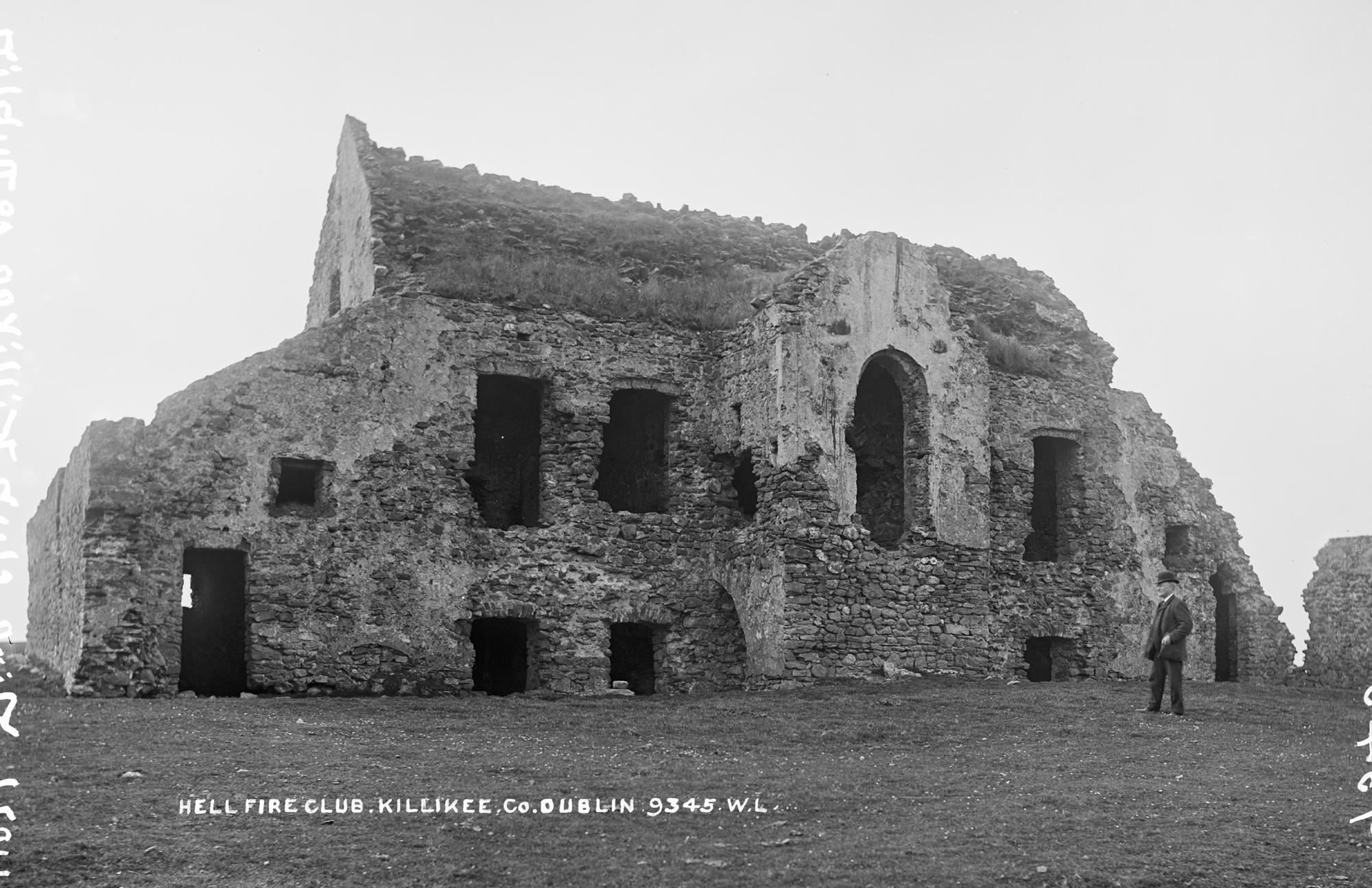
The Hell Fire Club in the early 1900s

The antiquarian Austin Cooper visited the house in 1779 and found it in a state of disrepair. Joseph Holt, a general of the Society of the United Irishmen recorded in his memoirs that he spent a night in the ruin of Mount Pelier while on the run following the 1798 Rebellion. Holt wrote of his experience, "I lay down in the arched room of that remarkable building. I felt confident of the protection of the Almighty that the name of enchantment and the idle stories that were told of the place had but a slight hold of my mind." The Conollys sold the lands to Luke White in 1800. They passed through inheritance to the Massy family of Duntrileage, County Limerick. When the Massy family became bankrupt, the lands were acquired by the State. Today, the building is maintained by Coillte, who manage the forestry plantations on Mount Pelier's slopes, and have installed concrete stairs and iron safety rails across the upper windows.

== The Stewards House ==
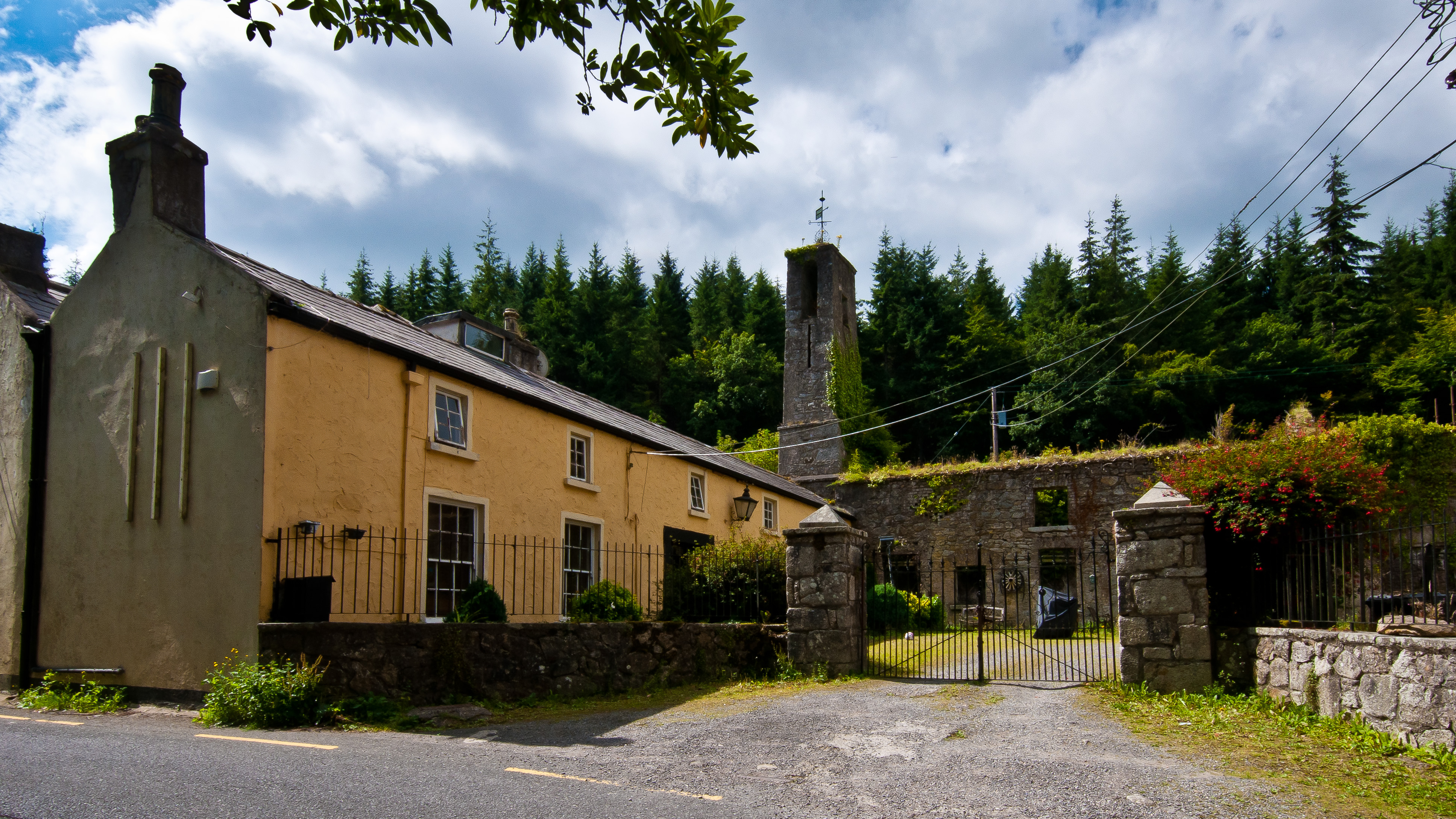
The Stewards House

Further down the hill, along the Military Road, is a two-story house, known as The Stewards House or as Killakee House (not to be confused with the now-demolished Killakee House that served as the residence of the Massy family who owned the adjacent Killakee Estate). It was built around 1765 by the Conolly family as a hunting lodge. Over the years, it has served as a dower house and as a residence for the agent who managed the Killakee Estate. To the rear is a belfry; this was once a common feature of large farmhouses and was used to call the workers for meals. The Hell Fire Club held meetings here for a time following the fire that damaged Mount Pelier lodge. The house has a reputation for being haunted, particularly by a large black cat. Stories regarding the origin of this spectre connect it either with the account of the priest who exorcised a cat at the Hell Fire Club or with a cat that was doused in whiskey and set alight by members of the Hell Fire Club before escaping across the mountains with its fur aflame.

The best documented account of these hauntings occurred between 1968 and 1970. The Evening Herald and Evening Press newspapers carried a number of reports regarding a Mrs Margaret O'Brien and her husband Nicholas, a retired Garda superintendent, who were converting the house into an arts centre. The redevelopment had been a troubled affair with tradesmen employed on the work leaving complaining of ghosts. One night, a friend of the O'Briens, artist Tom McAssey, and two workmen were confronted by a spectral figure and a black cat with glowing red eyes. McAssey painted a portrait of the cat which hung in the house for several years after. Although locals were sceptical of the reports, further apparitions were reported, most notably of an Indian gentleman and of two nuns called Blessed Margaret and Holy Mary who had taken part in black masses on Mount Pelier Hill. There were also reports of ringing bells and poltergeist activity. In 1970 an RTÉ television crew recorded a documentary at the house. In the documentary a clairvoyant called Sheila St. Clair communicated with the spirits of the house through automatic writing. In 1971, a plumber working in the house discovered a grave with a skeleton of a small figure, most likely that of a child or, perhaps, the body of the dwarf alleged to have been sacrificed by the members of the Hell Fire Club. The house operated as a restaurant in the 1990s before closing in 2001; it is now a private residence.

== Killakee (Lord Massy's) Estate ==
On the other side of the Military Road to Hell Fire Wood and the Stewards House is the remains of Killakee Estate (Irish: Coill an Chaoich, meaning 'Blind Man's Wood'), now known as Lord Massy's Estate. These lands were first granted to Walter de Ridleford after the Norman invasion and later given to Sir Thomas Luttrell, an ancestor of Hell Fire Club member Simon Luttrell, by Henry VIII. The Luttrell family held onto the estate until the seventeenth century when it was relinquished to Dudley Loftus and then passed to William Conolly. In 1800, the Conolly family sold the estate to Luke White.

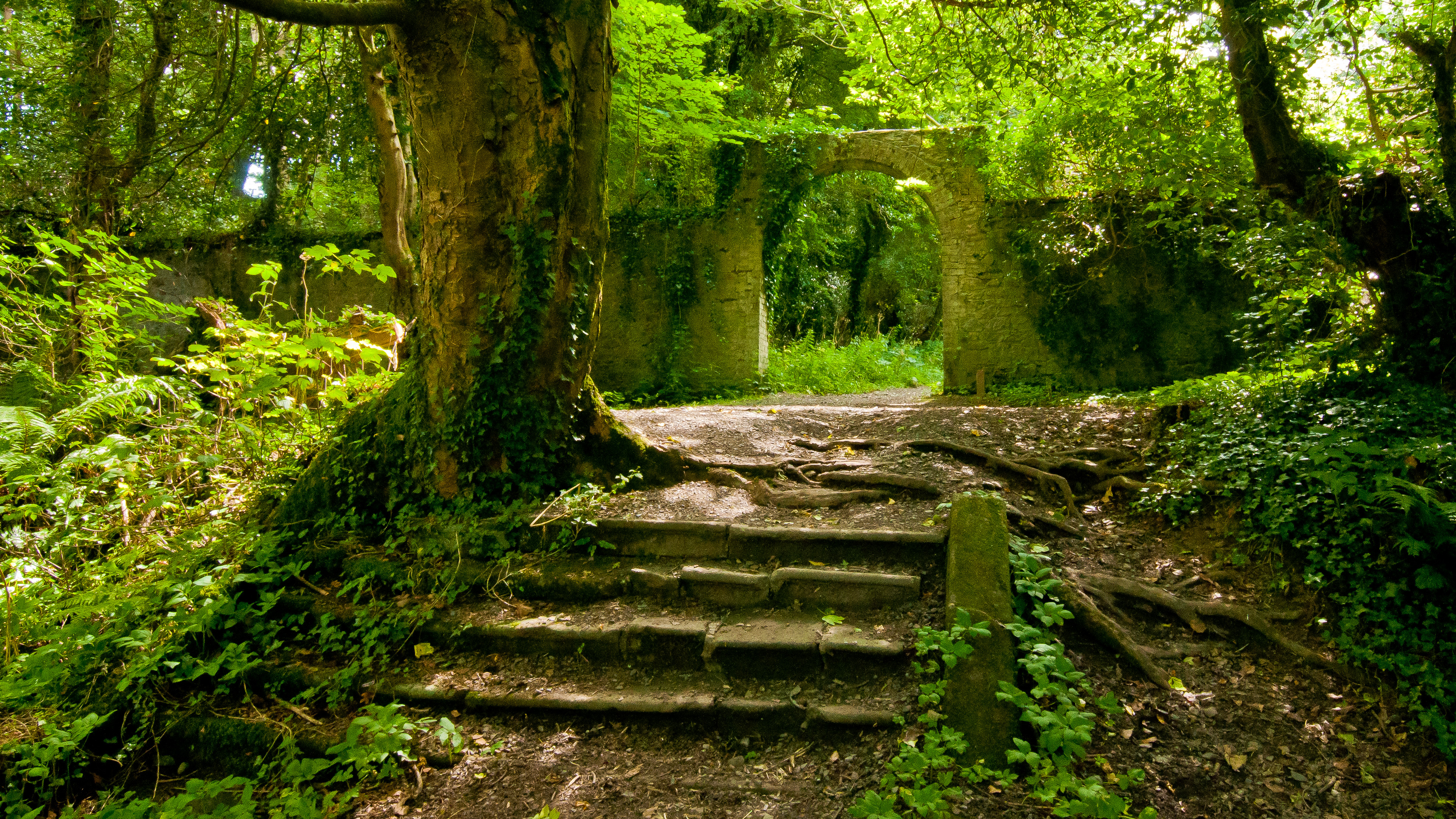
The ruined gardens of Killakee Estate

The White family built Killakee House on the estate in the early nineteenth century. This was a two-storey, thirty-six roomed stucco-faced house. It had a Tuscan-columned entrance and large three-windowed bows on the back and sides. Luke White's second son, Colonel Samuel White, inherited the estate on his father's death in 1824 and invested considerable effort in developing its gardens. In 1838, he engaged the services of Sir Ninian Niven, former director of the Botanic Gardens in Dublin. Niven laid out two Victorian formal gardens of gravel walks, terraces and exotic trees decorated with statues of Greek and Roman gods. Adjacent to the house was a terraced rose garden with a statue of Neptune. A second walled garden in a vale in the woods below the house contained more fountains and a range of glasshouses designed by Richard Turner. William Robinson, writing in The Gardener's Chronicle and Agricultural Gazette on 10 December 1864, said of the gardens "I know of no better example of the advantage of extensively planting and draining a barren and elevated district than is afforded by this demesne of 500 acres."

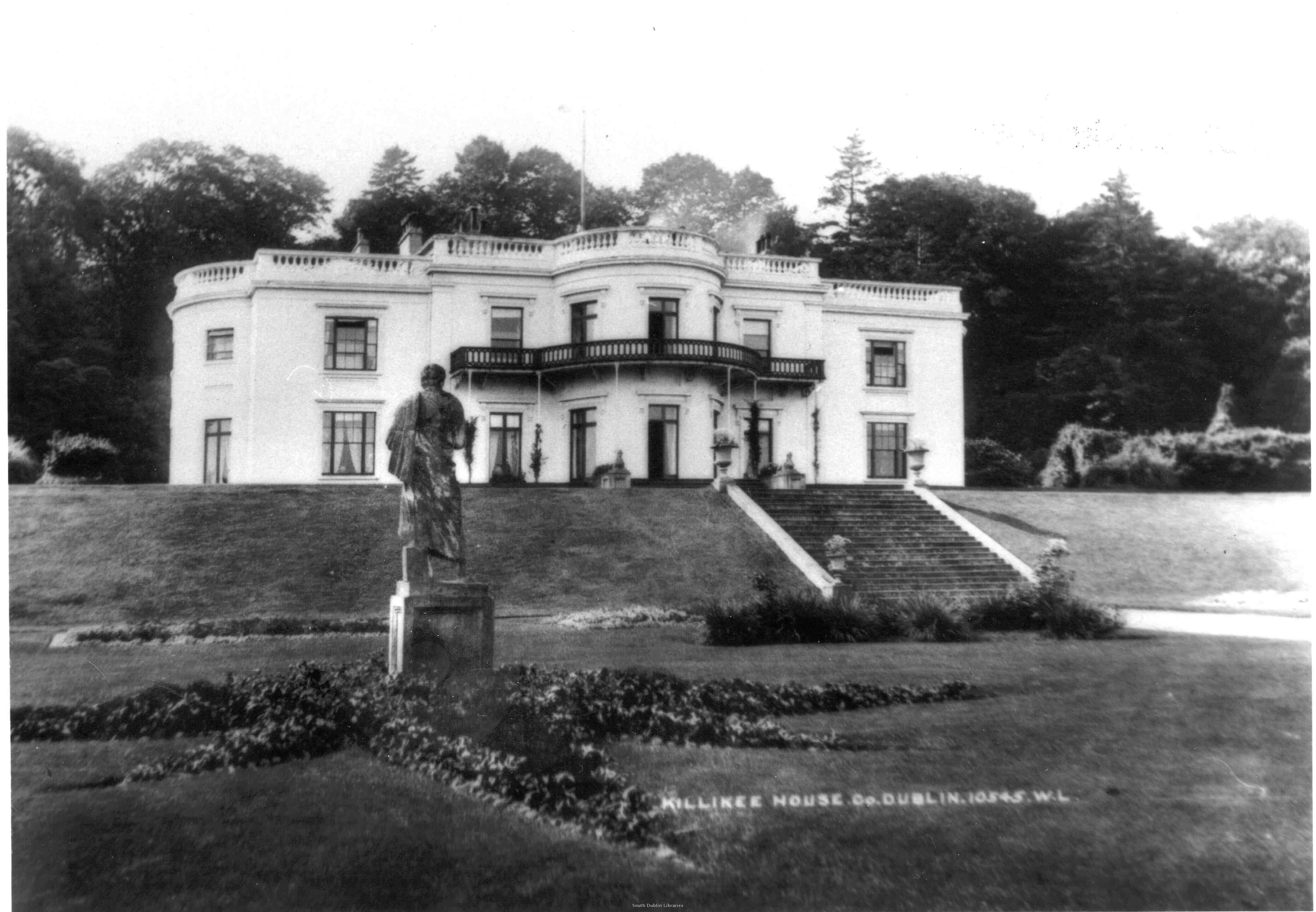
Killakee House, County Dublin, between ca. 1865–1914.

When Samuel White's widow, Anne, died in 1880, she bequeathed the estate to her late husband's nephew, John Thomas, 6th Baron Massy. The Massys were a Protestant Ascendancy family who had come to Ireland in 1641 and owned extensive lands in Counties Limerick, Leitrim and Tipperary. Massy used Killakee House to entertain guests while shooting game on nearby Cruagh and Glendoo mountains. He also used the house to host parties during major events on the Dublin social calendar such as the Dublin Horse Show, the Punchestown Races and the Dublin Castle Season. During these events long lines of guests' carriages could be seen stretched along the road leading to the house. However, as a result of declining rental income and poor investment decisions, John Thomas Massy was in considerable debt when he died in 1915. By the time John Massy's grandson, Hugh Hamon Charles, 8th Baron Massy, inherited the estate, the family's finances were in an irreversible decline and in 1924 he was declared bankrupt and evicted from Killakee House. The Massys initially moved into the Stewards House before taking up residence in Beehive Cottage, the estate's gate lodge, by agreement with the bank. Hamon Massy, unable to find a job on account of his alcoholism became dependent on his wife, Margaret, whose modest salary from a job with the Irish Hospitals' Sweepstake was the family's only income. In the years up to his death in 1958, Hamon Massy, who became known as the "Penniless Peer", could be seen collecting firewood in the woods of his former family estate.

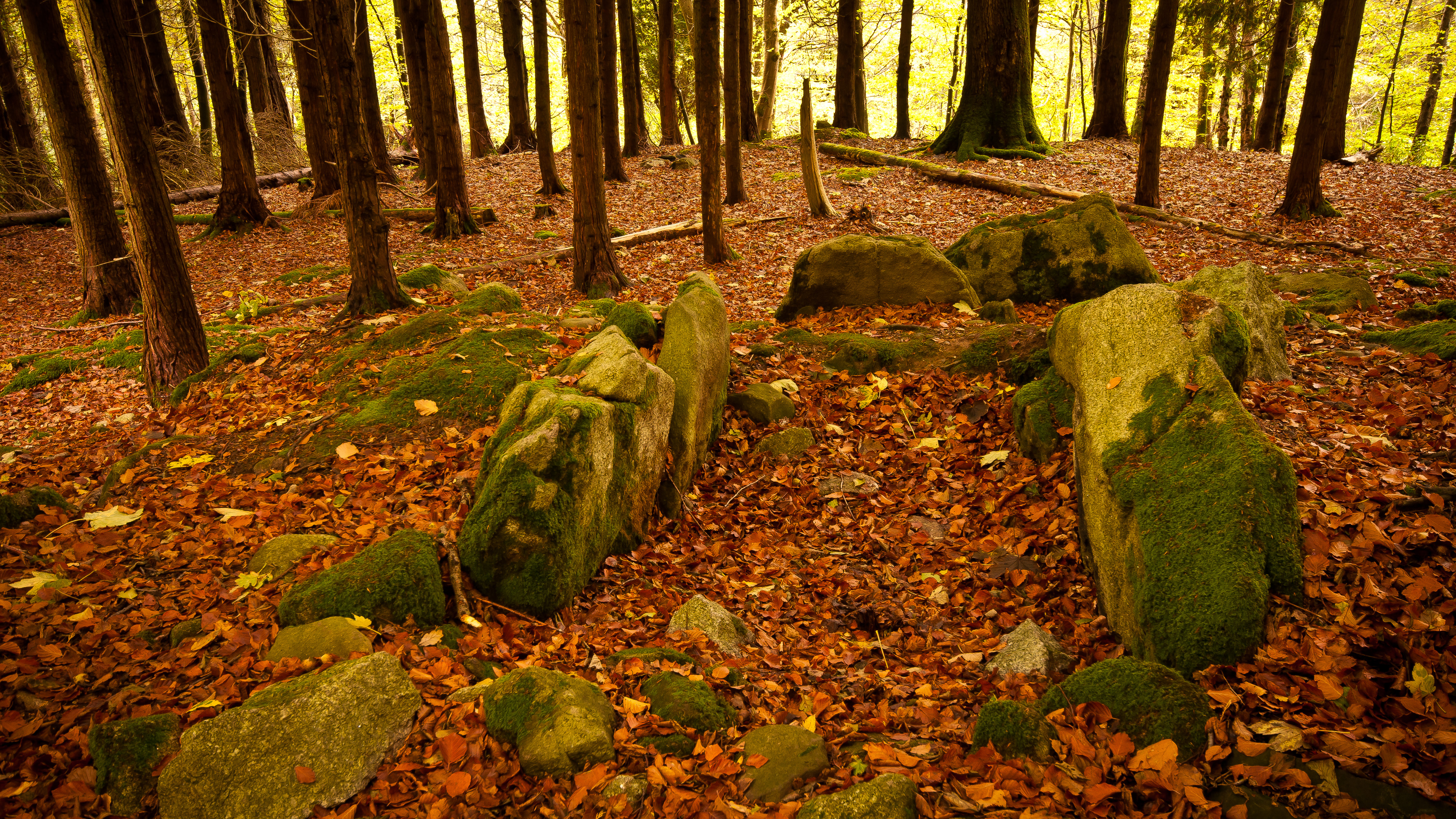
Killakee Wedge Tomb

Following the eviction, Killakee House was briefly used as an operations base by the Detective Unit of the Garda Síochána in 1931 while they hunted IRA subversives who were hiding explosives at Killakee. When the bank was unable to find a buyer for the estate, it was acquired by a builder who stripped the house and then demolished it in 1941. The lands were eventually acquired by the State and opened to the public. In the late 1930s, the Director of Forestry, a German called Otto Reinhard, laid out the area as an urban forest. The trees have reclaimed most of the land once occupied by the formal gardens: all that remains is the brickwork at the rear of the Turner glasshouses and the system of irrigation canals and ponds for the exotic plants contained within.

In 1978, the archaeologist and historian Patrick Healy discovered the remains of a prehistoric wedge tomb in the woods. All that survives is the skeletal outline of the main chamber and the outer double walls. Most of the stones were removed to build the low stone wall that runs across the front of the tomb.

== Carthy's Castle ==
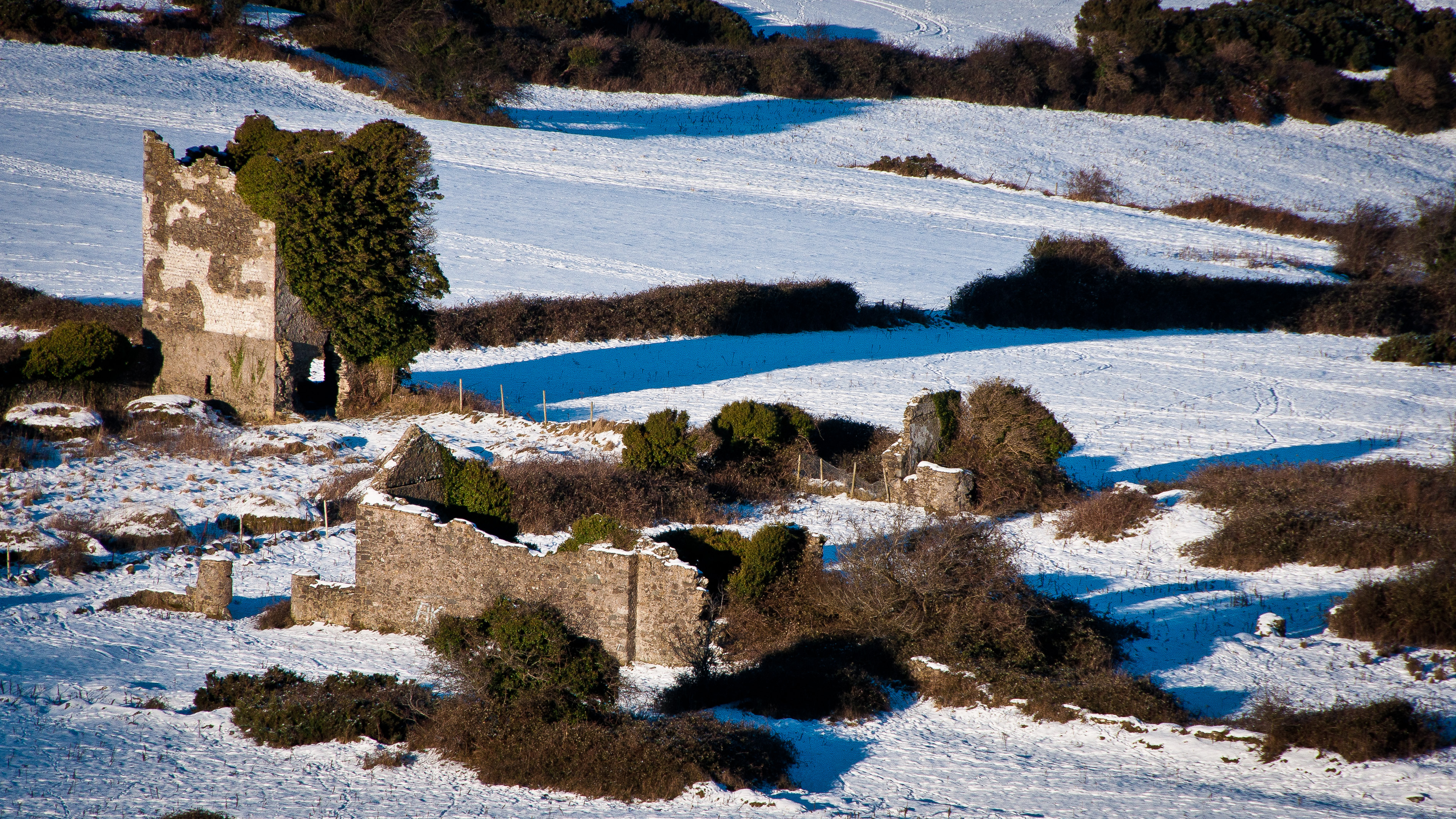
Carthy's Castle

On the northern slopes is another ruined building, known as Carthy's or McCarthy's Castle. This is all that remains of the original Mount Pelier House, also known as Dolly Mount and the "Long House". It was an Anglo-Irish country house built by Henry Loftus, Earl of Ely towards the end of the eighteenth century. The building was originally two storeys high with bow windows each side of the hall door, above which was the Ely coat of arms. At each side of the house was an arched gate from which extended a range of ancillary buildings, terminating in a three-storeyed tower with an embattled top and pointed windows. The interiors were noted for their marble chimneypieces and stuccoed ceilings. The earl's first wife, Frances Monroe, was the aunt of Dorothea "Dolly" Monroe who was a celebrated beauty and in whose honour the house was named Dolly Mount. The Charles Tottenham, who inherited the Loftus estates after Henry Loftus died in 1783, subsequently abandoned the residence. The building soon fell into ruin, mainly at the hands of a tenant called Jack Kelly who wrecked the house to ensure his tenancy would not be disturbed. All, except for the tower at the western end, which is now known as Carthy's Castle, was demolished in 1950.

== Orlagh House ==
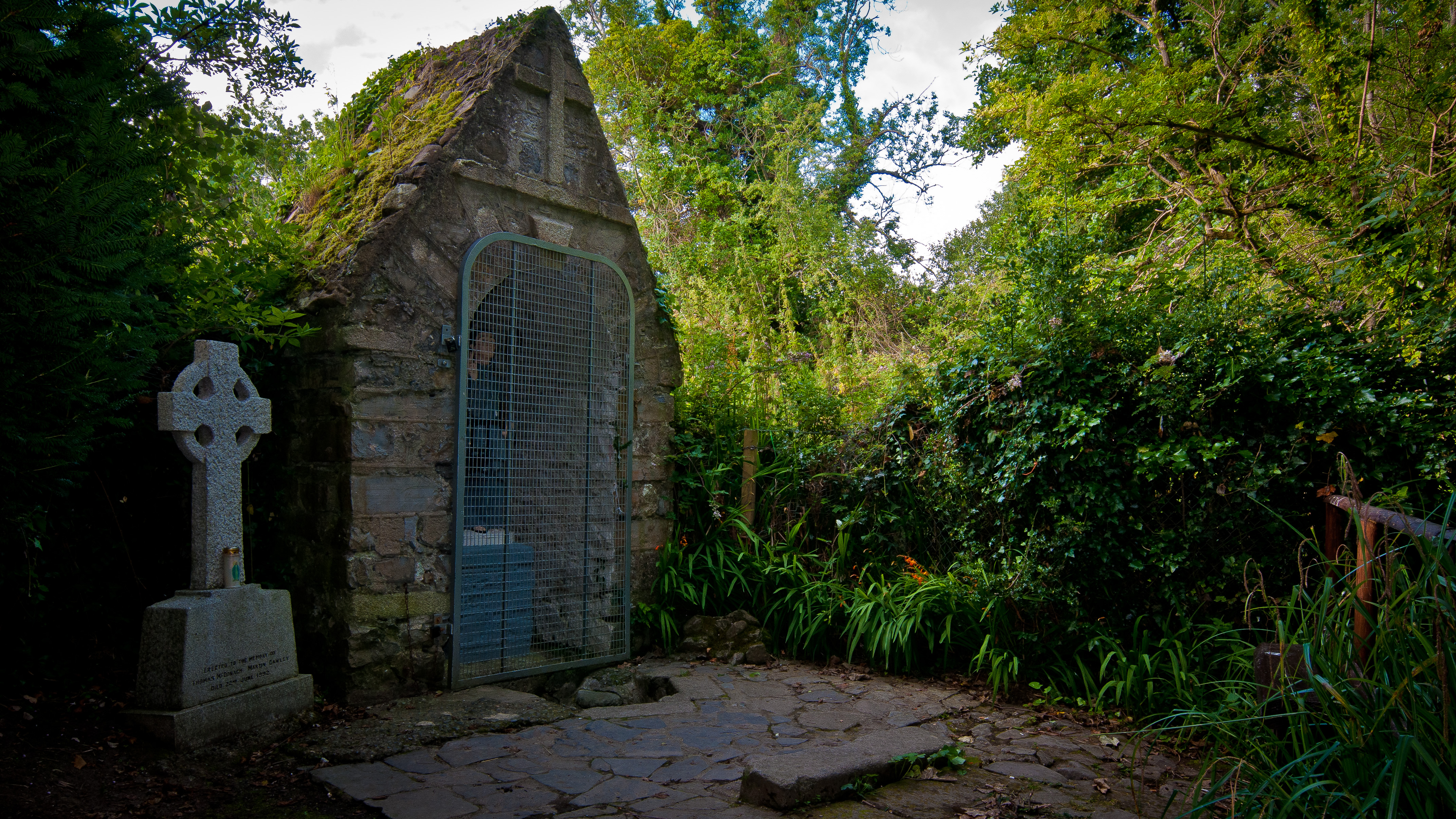
St Colmcille's Well

In the land adjacent to Carthy's Castle is Orlagh House which has been owned by the Augustinian Order since the mid-nineteenth century and is a retreat and conference centre run by the friars. It was built in 1790 by Mr Lundy Foot, a wealthy snuff merchant, who named the house Footmount. He was also a magistrate and was instrumental in condemning three members of the Kearney family to death for the murder of John Kinlan, the gamekeeper at Friarstown, near Bohernabreena, in 1816. Foot was subsequently murdered in 1835, an act that was attributed to relatives of the Kearneys. In fact, Foot was killed by James Murphy, the son of an evicted tenant farmer whose land Foot had bought following the eviction.

In 2017, Orlagh House was sold to a private buyer. With the decline in the Church, it was no longer economic for the small group of elderly Augustinians to live in such a large residence.

In a field opposite Orlagh House is a holy well associated with Saint Colmcille. A statue of the saint, designed by Joseph Tierney, was erected at the site in 1917. Pilgrims either drink the water or apply it to sore ears.

== Access and recreation ==
Mount Pelier Hill is accessed from the Hell Fire Wood car park along the R115 road between Rathfarnham and Glencullen. The woods consist of around 4.5 kilometres (2.8 miles) of forest roads and tracks. Lord Massy's Estate is also accessible from the R115 road, close to the Hell Fire Wood car park. The woods offer a nature trail and a permanent orienteering course. Lord Massy's Estate and Mount Pelier are also traversed by the Dublin Mountains Way hiking trail that runs between Shankill and Tallaght.

== Development plans ==
In March 2017 plans were announced by South Dublin County Council, Coillte and the Dublin Mountains Partnership for a major Dublin Mountains Project development on the site of Mount Pelier Hill and the Hellfire Club, involving parking, a cafe, a treetop walkway, improved trails, and a Visitors Centre.

Local residents and community groups have expressed opposition to the plan, citing the delicate ecosystem of the area, risks of damage to recently discovered megalithic artwork, and fears of traffic congestion resulting from a possible 300,000 visitors to the site. These groups have launched a campaign entitled "Save the Hellfire" aimed at persuading An Bord Pleanála to refuse planning permission for the project.
