= Sales of Irish country house contents =

The dispersion of artefacts, through the Sale of Irish country house contents, occurred over a period of hundreds of years starting with major sales after the Irish Rebellion of 1798 and later with the financial after effects of the Irish famine leading to the creation of the Encumbered Estates' Court in 1849.

Later surges in sales and destruction of items occurred during the Easter Rising in 1916 and later again with the destruction of Irish country houses during the Irish War of Independence.

Post world war sales and fires resulted in the destruction of further contents while large auction sales from the 1950s through to the mid 1990s resulted in the loss of further contents, particularly during recessionary periods such as the early to mid 1980s.

After the beginning of the Celtic Tiger era (circa 1990 onwards), the sale of contents has been more rigorously catalogued with all but the most exceptionally valuable lots staying in the hands of other home owners within the state or going to national cultural institutions and galleries.

In the early 21st century, both the National Gallery of Ireland and the National Museum of Ireland have both had first-refusal and prior notice on important items which have been placed on the market for sale.

== List of auctions ==
Year	House	County	Date	Auction House	Vendor	Notes and contents sold
1875	Santry Court	Dublin	1875		Sir C.C.W. Domvile	Most high value contents in a 10 day sale
1890	Kilcroney House, Bray	Wicklow	29 July 1890	Battersby & Company	Built by Humphrey Lloyd and residence of Matthew P D'arcy	
1904	63 Fitzwilliam Square North	Dublin	23-25 July 1904	Battersby & Company	Objects owned by Sir Robert Foster	
1910	Ely House, Ely Place, Dublin	Dublin	8 November 1910	Bennett & Son	Thornley Stoker	
1911	Dunsandle House	Galway	April 1911	Bennett & Son	Daly family	A significant portion of the contents were ultimately transferred to Russborough House by the owner Major Denis Daly.
1913	Rathfarnham Castle	Dublin	2 April 1913	Battersby & Company		Many lots were acquired by the Jesuits who had recently purchased the property.
1914	Bishopscourt, Straffan	Kildare	13 July 1914	Battersby & Company		Contents of house, land and library of Earl of Clonmell
1916	Hermitage House	Limerick	20 January 1916	William B Fitt		Some of the most valuable contents were transferred to Killakee House.
1918	Laurentum House, Clashmore	Waterford	1918			Contents clearance
1919	Castlefreke	Cork	October 1919	Marsh's		
1919	Killakee House	Dublin	8 July 1919	Bennett & Son		
1921	Gosford Castle	Armagh	4-13 April 1921	Battersby & Company		Residence of Earl of Gosford
1921	Garvagh House	Derry	20 September 1921	Battersby & Company		Property of Lord Garvagh
1921	Castletown Cox	Kilkenny	11 October 1921	Battersby & Company	Windham Wyndham-Quin, 5th Earl of Dunraven and Mount-Earl	Selected contents
1921	Tara Hall	Meath	November 1921	Battersby & Company	John Moore-Brabazon, 1st Baron Brabazon of Tara	
1922	Hazelwood House, Sligo	Sligo	18 May 1922	Battersby & Company	Muriel and Philip Dudley Perceval	
1925	Lucan Manor	Dublin	29 September 1925	Bennett & Son	Captain Richard St John Jefferyes Colthurst	Entire contents
1925	Carton House	Kildare	11-13 November 1925	Bennett & Son	Edward FitzGerald, 7th Duke of Leinster	Majority of contents
1929	Upperscourt House	Kilkenny	1929		M. and E. Maher	
1932	Charleville House, Enniskerry	Wicklow	31 October 1932		Viscount Monck	
1935	Kilkenny Castle	Kilkenny	18 November 1935	Battersby & Company	Marquess of Ormonde; Earl of Ossory	
1936	Shanganagh Castle, Shankill	Dublin	10 August 1936	Battersby & Company		
1937	Moore Abbey, Monasterevan	Kildare	15 February 1937	Battersby & Company	Count John McCormack	All contents
1939	Iveagh House	Dublin	28-29 September 1939	Battersby & Company	Earl of Iveagh	2,600 lots
1939	Ashford Castle	Mayo	15 May 1939 (2 weeks)	Jackson Stops and McCabe	Iveagh Trustees	Entire Contents
1943	Rokeby Hall, Dunleer	Louth	1943	North's	Maud Montgomery	
1944	Johnstown Castle	Wexford	1 May 1944	Jackson Stops & McCabe		The contents of the castle were sold off at a public auction lasting five days
1944	Santry Court	Dublin	1944		Sir Compton Meade Domville	Remaining contents
1948	Carrickbyrn, Foxrock	Dublin	1948	Hamilton and Hamilton	Estate of Mrs Lansell Jacob	
1949	Carton House	Kildare	1949	Allen & Townsend	Duke of Leinster	Remainder of Library
1950	Glenmaroon House, Chapelizod	Dublin	1950	James Adam & Sons	The Residence of the late Hon. A.E. Guinness, By Direction of the Lady Oranmore and Browne	
1950	Shelton Abbey	Wicklow	16 October 1950	Allen & Townsend Clarke Delahunt	Earl of Wicklow	Contents
1951	Tervoe, Clarina	Limerick	27 September 1951	William B Fitt	Captain John de la Poer Monsell	Books
1952	Mount Trenchard, Foynes	Limerick	19 September 1952	Good and Ganly William B Fitt	Lt Commander CE Hall R.N.R	
1953	Killeen Castle, Dunsany	Meath	15-20 July 1953	Town and Country Estates (Ireland) Ltd	Earl of Fingall	
1954	Favour Royal	Tyrone	1954	Town and Country Estates (Ireland) Ltd	Major Moutray	Military collection
1957	Oak Park	Carlow	29 October 1957	Hamilton and Hamilton Estates Ltd		Valuable contents
1958	Cooleen, Castletroy	Limerick	19 June 1958		EV Hewson	
1958	Gloster House	Offaly	28-31 October 1958	Town and Country Estates Limited	Major ETT Lloyd	Almost all contents
1960	Coolbawn Hotel, Castleconnell	Limerick	1960	Louis De Courcy		Contents
1960	Bowen's Court	Cork	April 1960	W. Marsh & Sons Ltd		Most contents
1960	Straffan House	Kildare	1960	Jackson Stops McCabe		The house later became part of the K Club.
1961	Graigue, Palmerston Park	Dublin	28 February 1961	James Adam & Sons	Henry Mangan (deceased)	Library including ancient books
1961	Bowen's Court	Cork	1961	Marsh's	Elizabeth Bowen	Library
1962	Dromoland Castle	Clare	1962		Lord Inchiquin	
1962	Rose Hill	Kilkenny	14-18 May 1962	McCreery & Sons	Michael F Murphy	
1962	Cahir Park House	Tipperary	1962	Battersby & Company		
1962	Tobertynan	Meath	13-14 February 1962	Owen Martin	Duke of Stacpole	
1963	Milverton Hall, Skerries	Dublin	10-11 September 1963	Hamilton and Hamilton		
1963	Courtown House, Kilcock	Kildare	10 June 1963	Hamilton and Hamilton		Entire contents
1964	Kenure House	Dublin	21-24 September 1964	J.H. North & Co. Ltd	Colonel RH Fenwick Palmer	Entire valuable contents
1966	Castletown House	Kildare	1966	Jackson-Stops and McCabe		18th-20th century furniture and pictures residue
1966	Kiladoon, Celbridge	Kildare	31 October 1966	Sothebys	Colonel HTW Clements and formed by the late HJB Clements	Library and manuscripts
1968	Clonmannon, Ashford, County Wicklow	Wicklow	21 May 1968	James Adam & Sons	Executors of Sir Chester Beatty	
1968	Rockfield, Kells, County Meath	Meath	6-7 March 1968	Keane Mahony Smith W & G Armstrong		Entire contents
1969	Doneraile Court	Cork	December 1969	Hamilton and Hamilton (Estates) Limited	Lord Doneraile (Executor)	Entire Library
1970	Florence Court	Fermanagh	10 November 1970	John Ross & Company	Earl of Enniskillen	Surplus antiques and furnishings
1972	Derk	Limerick	10 April 1972	Stokes & Quirke		Entire contents
1976	Moyglare House, Maynooth	Kildare	13-14 December 1976	Sotheby Keany Mahoney SMith	Dr and Mrs WG Fegan	Contens
1976	Clonbrock House	Galway	1 November 1976	Christie, Manson & Woods Lisney & Son	Mr Luke Dillon Mahon	
1976	Newtown Park House, Blackrock	Dublin	1976	Hamilton & Hamilton Christies Manson & Woods Ltd	Mr. and Mrs. E. A. McGuire	
1976	Malahide Castle	Dublin	10-12 May 1976	Keane Mahony Smith Christies Manson & Woods Ltd	Rose Maud Talbot	Entire contents
1977	Donacomper, Celbridge	Kildare	25-26 July 1977	Hamilton & Hamilton Christies Manson & Woods Ltd	Mr and Mrs Bruce Breedin	
1977	Carton House	Kildare	1977		Lord Brockett David Nall Cain	
1977	White Lodge, Ballycastle	Antrim	20 September 1977	Osborne, King and Megran		
1978	Slane Castle	Meath	20 November 1978	Sothebys		
1978	Charleville House, Enniskerry	Wicklow	1978	Hamilton & Hamilton Christies Manson & Woods Ltd	Donald Davies	
1979	Clonmannon, Ashford, County Wicklow	Wicklow	25 October 1979	Hamilton & Hamilton		
1979	Bettyglen, Raheny	Dublin	3-4 August 1979	Hamilton & Hamilton Christies Manson & Woods Ltd	W.H. Ahern. It was formerly one of the homes of the Jameson family.	
1980	Coollattin House, Shillelagh	Wicklow	1980	Hamilton & Hamilton Christies Manson & Woods Ltd	Michael Brendan Cadogan	
1980	Milverton Hall, Skerries	Dublin	1980		Woods family	
1981	Charleville Castle	Offaly	1981	Allen & Townsend Philips		
1981	Birr Castle	Offaly	7-8 October 1981	Christies	The Trustees of the Oxmantown Settlement Trust	Selected contents.
1981	Slane Castle	Meath	1981			
1982	Glyde Court, Tallanstown	Louth	15-16 September 1982	Nicholas Nicholson	Colonel and Mrs A C May	
1982	Adare Manor	Limerick	9-10 June 1982	Christie, Manson & Woods Ltd Hamilton & Hamilton (Estates) Ltd	Thady Wyndham-Quin, 7th Earl of Dunraven and Mount-Earl	Works by artists including Van Dyck, Rubens, Teniers and Pugin.
1983	Ballinamona Park	Waterford	1983	George Mealy & Sons		Entire clearance
1983	Coollattin House	Wicklow	28 June 1983	Hamilton & Hamilton (Estates) Ltd		
1983	Luttrellstown Castle	Dublin	1983	Christie Manson & Woods	Aileen Plunket	1,558 lots (Entire contents)
1984	Powerscourt Estate	Wicklow	24-25 September 1984	Christie Manson & Woods		
1984	Cabinteely House, Cabinteely	Dublin	5-6 November 1984	Chisties		613 lots
1984	Oldbridge House, Drogheda	Meath	19 June 1984	Gunne	Mrs DH Coddington	All contents
1985	Alton Grange, Foxrock	Dublin	16 September 1985	Christies		683 lots
1986	Glenard, Taylors Hill	Galway	23 February 1986	Rooney	Miss E Boland executors	
1986	Carrickmines House	Dublin	10 February 1986	Christies and Edmiston's Ltd Hamilton and Hamilton (Estates) Ltd	Dan McInerney	
1986	Mount Juliet Golf & Spa Hotel	Kilkenny	1986	Sothebys	Major V McAlmont	
1986	Castle Hacket	Galway	2-4 July 1986	Christies and Edmiston's Ltd Hamilton and Hamilton (Estates) Ltd	Percy Paley (Estate)	
1987	19 North Great George's Street	Dublin	2-3 November 1987	Christies and Edmiston's Ltd Hamilton and Hamilton (Estates) Ltd	The Property of Harold Clarke, Iain MacLachlan, Mrs. Eve Kaye and two other sources	
1987	Mount Juliet Golf & Spa Hotel	Kilkenny	1987	Christies	McAlmont family.	649 lots
1988	Castlegar, Ballinasloe	Galway	24-25 May 1988	Christies Hamilton Osborne King	John Horan	
1988	Somerton, Castleknock	Dublin	24-25 May 1988	Christies Hamilton Osborne King	TK Laidlaw	
1988	Tinerana	Clare	10-11 October 1988	Hamilton Osborne King	Mr and Mrs Peter Gleeson and Mr and Mrs Patrick Gleeson	
1988	Killora Lodge	Cork	12 September 1988	Alain Chawner		
1988	Mountainstown House, Navan	Meath	28-29 September 1988	Christies Hamilton Osborne King	John Pollock	1,126 lots
1990	Straffan House	Kildare	28 February 1990	Christies Scotland Hamilton Osborne King	The Kildare Hotel and Country Club	515 lots
1990	Dromin House, Ardee	Louth	25 September 1990	Hamilton Osborne King		
1991	Castletown Cox	Kilkenny	7-8 October 1991	Christies Hamilton Osborne King	George Magan	
1992	Humewood Castle	Wicklow	15-16 July 1992	EA Coonan Hamilton Osborne King		
1992	Stackallan House	Meath	20 October 1992	Christies Hamilton Osborne King	EM Burke	591 lots
1992	Woodstock House	Wicklow	1992	Hamilton Osborne King		Library
1993	Lyrath	Kilkenny	15 September 1993	Christies Hamilton Osborne King	Captain and Mrs A C Tupper	606 lots
1995	Farney Castle, Thurles	Tipperary	4 July 1995	Gunne		Entire contents
1995	Glencullen House, Kiltiernan	Dublin	5 July 1995	Adams		Entire valuable contents
1995	Gortdrishagh	Galway	9 July 1995	Adams	Mrs M R Glynn	
1996	Powerstown House, Clonee	Meath	July 1996	Hamilton Osborne King		
1997	St Clerans, Craughwell	Galway	5 June 1997	Gunne	John Huston	
1998	Sandbrook House, Balon	Carlow	20 October 1998	Mealy's	Mr and Mrs Nigel Trevithick	
1998	Raford House	Galway	20 October 1998	Mealy's	Lord and Lady Hemphill	
1999	Garretstown House	Meath	1999	Mealy's	Prince and Princess Guirey	
1999	Rockfield, Kells, County Meath	Meath	1999	Hamilton Osborne King	A Cameron	
2000	Mount Falcon	Mayo	26 June 2000	Hamilton Osborne King	Aldridge Family	Entire contents
2000	Mount John House, Newtownmountkennedy	Wicklow	15 November 2000	Adams	Joan Kennedy-Kisch	
2002	Farnham House	Cavan	27 January 2002	Hamilton Osborne King	Originally the home of Baron Farnham.	
2003	Mourne Park	Down	14-15 April 2003	Hamilton Osborne King	Philip Anley and Bonnie Horsman	1,000+ lots
2003	Lissadell House	Sligo	25 November 2003	Christies Hamilton Osborne King		Contents
2006	Luggala estate	Wicklow	2 May 2006	Mealy's	Garech Browne	antique furniture and art
2009	Glin Castle	Limerick	7 May 2009	Christies	Desmond Fitzgerald	200 lots
2011	Lyons Demesne	Kildare	14 July 2011	Christies	Tony Ryan	Art collection
2012	Mount Kennedy, Newtownmountkennedy	Wicklow	16 March 2012	Christies		Combined auction
2012	Mount Congreve	Waterford	May and July 2012	Christies Mealy's	Ambrose Congreve	1,100 lots with Mealy's and later 120 lots at Christies
2014	Bantry House	Cork	21 October 2014	Lyon & Turnbull		
2015	Courtown House	Kildare	22 April 2015	Adams		
2016	Lotabeg House	Cork	24 May 2016	Mealy's	Collection of Vincent Hart (d 1839)	763 lots
2016	Loughton House, Moneygall	Offaly	27-30 September 2016	Sheppard’s		
2021	Howth Castle	Dublin	September 2021	Fonsie Mealy	Lord Howth	Entire contents

== See also ==
- British country house contents auctions
- Desmond FitzGerald, 29th Knight of Glin
