= Auction house =

Place where auctions are held

An auction house is a business establishment that facilitates the buying and selling of assets, such as works of art and collectibles.

== Overview ==
The auction house is the physical facility where the objects are catalogued, displayed, and presented to the prospective buyers through a bidding process system.

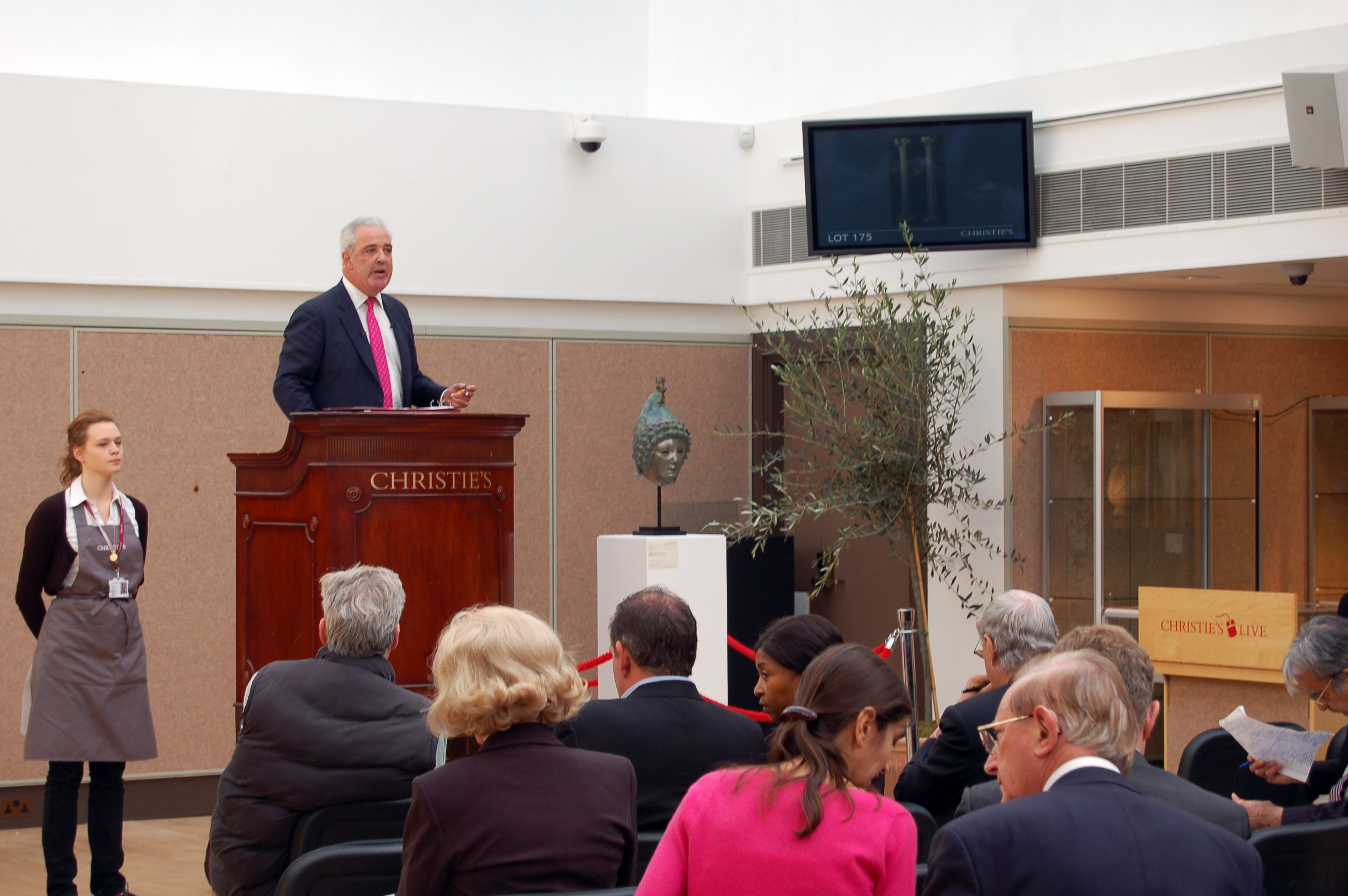
An auction house

The private individual or company managing the house, usually offer services such as clearances, collection of items, shipping, while also advising through valuations, and on fixing reserve amounts.

Two auction houses emerged in eighteenth-century England that persisted leading the market. Initially specializing in the auctioning of books and literary goods, Sotheby's was founded in 1744, and in 1766 Christie's opened by auctioning paintings and decorative arts.

Auctioned goods may vary from fine wines to toys, from furniture to entire estates. As the range of goods sold at these auction houses expanded, they opened auctions over the phone first, and on the Internet after, making possible purchasing goods fully remotely.

One of the most relevant roles within an auction house is the auctioneer, who has the task of conducting the actual auction. The auctioneer declares the rules of the auction, inform the sequence of items being sold, acknowledges bids made, and announces the winner by tapping a gavel.

== See also ==
- Auction
- Bidding
- Reverse auction
- Ebidding
- English auction
- British country house contents auctions
