= Walker George Films =

Walker George Films, founded in 2005 by Stephen Walker and Sally George, is a production company producing films for British television, including the BBC, ITV and Channel 4.

Walker has directed around 14 films, and was voted in the top 10 directors in the UK in Broadcast magazine in 2007. George has directed or produced around 12 films, including The Human Face with John Cleese, which was nominated for two Emmy awards.

Two of their documentaries have followed the life of Alex Stobbs, who has cystic fibrosis. The first, A Boy Called Alex, was broadcast in 2008, and the second, Alex: A Passion for Life (2009), followed Alex's first year as a chorister at King's College, Cambridge, as he prepared to conduct Bach's St Matthew Passion in April 2009.

The company's first film, Young@Heart, was released in April 2008 and documents the Young at Heart Chorus as they deal with deteriorating health but perform music that might be unexpected for their age. The film has won numerous awards, including Best International Feature at the Los Angeles Film Festival 2007.
