= British country house contents auctions =

British and Irish country house contents auctions are usually held on site at the country house, and have been used to raise funds for their owners, usually before selling the house and estate. Such auctions include the sale of high quality antique paintings, furniture, objets d'art, tapestries, books, and other household items.

== History ==
Country house contents auctions have been held formally since at least the mid 18th century, when dedicated auction houses were founded. The main auctioneers coordinating these sales today are Sotheby's, Christie's and Bonhams, with other auctions conducted by Lawrence's. A high quality auction catalogue is also published, giving details and photographs of the lots, including provenance, technical descriptions and estimated sale price ranges. These catalogues can also become collectables in their own right.

The largest on-site contents auction to date, by proceeds value, is Viscount Leverhulme's Thornton Manor in the Wirral, raising over £9.5 million in 2001. However, in present-day values, the largest is still probably the Earl of Rosebery's Mentmore Towers in Buckinghamshire, which generated over £6 million in 1977. The Wentworth Woodhouse £15 million auction in 1998 is excluded because the items had not been in situ in the house prior to the auction, and they were not auctioned at the house, but rather in Christie's London auction rooms. However, all these figures are occasionally eclipsed by the one-off sale of a special painting or drawing (not listed here), such as the private sale of Castle Howard's Sir Joshua Reynolds Portrait of Omai to Tate Britain for £12.5 million in March 2003, and Alnwick Castle's sale of Raphael's Madonna of the Pinks to the National Gallery, London for £35 million in 2004. Additionally, there can be the sale of paintings no longer in situ, but on loan to galleries, such as the 7th Duke of Sutherland of Mertoun House who sold Titian's Diana and Actaeon for £50m in 2008 and Diana and Callisto for £45m in 2012 to the British and Scottish National Galleries, both originally hanging in Bridgewater House from 1854 until 1939.

Below is a list, in reverse chronology, of the most significant country house auctions, including those in Scotland and Wales (if not specifically stated, the house is in England). Also listed are the number of days the auction took to complete (in brackets), the name of the auction house, the gross auction proceeds and the total number of sale lots, if the information is available.

== Contents auctions (in reverse chronology) ==
- 2013 July 23 - July 24 (2) — Trelissick House Truro, Cornwall, the Cunliffe-Copeland collection (Bonhams, £3.3m, 835 lots, sold in situ.)
- 2012 Mar 14 - Mar 15 (2) — Blair Castle, Dalry, North Ayrshire, Scotland, Castle owned by Blair family for over 900 years (Lyon & Turnbull, £1.2m, about 932 lots, items viewed in situ, sold in Edinburgh).
- 2011 Sep 13 - Sep 15 (3) — Cowdray Park, Midhurst, West Sussex, and from Dunecht House, Scotland (Christie's, £7,939,800, 1,200 lots)
- 2011 Mar 30 - Mar 30 (1) — Kinross House, Perth and Kinross, Scotland, with contents from London home of Mrs Spencer-Churchill (Christie's, £1,505,350, 292 lots, sold in London)
- 2010 Oct 05 - Oct 07 (3) — Chatsworth House, Derbyshire, Attic Sale, including some former contents of Devonshire House, London for the 12th Duke of Devonshire (Sotheby's, £5.3 million, 1,416 lots)
- 2010 Jan 20 - Jan 20 (1) — Newton Hall, Newton on the Moor, Northumberland, Widdrington family collection (Christie's, £876,787, 291 lots, sold in South Kensington, London)
- 2009 Oct 13 - Oct 13 (1) — Dutton Homestall, West Sussex, contents of Stoke Brunswick School (resident from 1958), formerly home of Lords Dewar and Forteviot (Lambert & Foster, Batcheller Thacker, under £1m, 850 lots)
- 2008 Jun 18 & Jun 24 (2) — Woolbeding House, West Sussex, collection of Simon Sainsbury, proceeds to the Monument Trust (Christie's, £29.6 million, 374 lots in 3 auctions, items not in situ, sold in London)
- 2007 Oct 08 – Oct 09 (2) — Newton Surmaville, Somerset for the heirs of Sophia Wyndham Rawlins (Lawrence's, about 900 lots)
- 2007 July 12 - July 13 (2) — Dumfries House, East Ayrshire, Scotland for the 7th Marquess of Bute (Christie's, sold privately 2 weeks before auction, est. £12-£14m)
- 2007 June 1 – June 3 (3) — Loudham Hall, Suffolk (Lyon & Turnbull, £2.1m, about 2,000 lots, items only in situ post 1983)
- 2006 Oct 24 - Oct 24 (1) — Chanter's House, Devon, and items from Fillongley Hall, Warwickshire) (Sotheby's, £1,488,334, 492 lots)
- 2006 Sep 19 - Sep 21 (3) — Shrubland Park, Suffolk (Sotheby's, £4,518,784, up to 1,776 lots)
- 2006 July 17 - July 18 (2) — Gyrn Castle, Wales, and items from Nantlys, Mostyn Hall, Capesthorne Hall) (Christie's, £1m, over 800 lots)
- 2005 Jun 08 – June 8 (1) — Moundsmere Manor, Hampshire (Christie's, £361,632, 254 lots, sold in London)
- 2005 May 17 - May 19 (3) — Easton Neston, Northamptonshire for the 3rd Baron Hesketh (Sotheby's, £8,727,964, up to 1,574 lots)
- 2005 May 4 – May 4 (1) — Pallinsburn House, Northumberland (& items from Sundrum Castle, Scotland) (Lyon & Turnbull)
- 2005 Jan 12 – Janu 13 (2) — Hampton Court, Isle of Man (Christie's, only in situ by David Style post 1978)
- 2004 Jun 21 - June 21 (1) — Chirk Castle, Wrexham, Wales (Christie's, £1.4 million, over 500 lots)
- 2003 July 21 – July 22 (2) — Wormington Manor, Gloucestershire (Christie's, £1,359,894, up to 919 lots)
- 2002 Oct 08 - Octo 09 (2) — Fulbeck Hall, Lincolnshire (Christie's, £1,390,606, up to 609 lots)
- 2002 May 28 - May 30 (3) — Barnwell Manor and Barnwell Castle, Northamptonshire for Prince Richard, Duke of Gloucester (Sotheby's, £1,606,044, up to 1,493 lots)
- 2002 April 11 - April 11 (1) — Scawby Hall, Lincolnshire (Sotheby's, £685,109, 322 lots)
- 2001 Jun 26 - June 28 (3) — Thornton Manor, Merseyside (Sotheby's, £9,540,431, up to 1,287 lots)
- 2000 May 9 - May 11 (3) — Benacre Hall, Suffolk (Sotheby's, £8,290,106, up to 1,691 lots)
- 1999 Oct 19 - Octo 20 (2) — Margam Park, Glamorgan, Wales (Sotheby's, £1,168,806, up to 870 lots)
- 1999 Oct 05 - Octo 05 (1) — Stansted Park, Hampshire (Sotheby's, £1,294,544, 535 lots)
- 1998 Sep 28 - Sep 29 (2) — Noseley Hall, Leicestershire (Sotheby's, £2,671,189, 567 lots)
- 1998 July 8 – July 8 (1) — Wentworth Woodhouse, Yorkshire (Christie's, £15,327,125, 92 lots, items not in situ, sold in London), after a similar sale in 1987, mostly sculpture
- 1998 Apr 20 - April 22 (3) — Hackwood Park, Hampshire (Christie's, £7,030,908, up to 1,681 lots)
- 1996 May 29 - May 31 (3) — Hadspen House, Castle Cary, Somerset (Sotheby's, 1,562 lots)
- 1994 Sep 28 - Oct 01 (4) — Stokesay Court, Shropshire (Sotheby's, £4,219,755, up to 2,143 lots)
- 1984 June 4 – June 5 (2) — St Osyth's Priory, Essex (Christie's, £581,547)
- 1978 May 31 – June 1 (2) — Wateringbury Place, Kent (Christie's, £1.37m, only in situ by David Style post 1945)
- 1977 May 18 - May 26 (9) — Mentmore Towers, Buckinghamshire for the 7th Earl of Rosebery (Sotheby's, over £6,000,000)
- 1968 Jun 04 - June 5 (2) — Pyrford Court, Surrey (Christie, Manson & Woods, 619 lots)
- 1949 July 18 - July 21 (4) — Kimbolton Castle, Huntingdonshire for the 10th Duke of Manchester (Knight, Frank & Rutley, 1,246 lots)
- 1948 Mar 01 - Oct 14 (?) — Wentworth Woodhouse, Yorkshire for Lady Juliet Tadgell (Sotheby's, c. 2,000 lots sold on site and in London: 1–2 March & 26–28 April Sotheby's books; 11 & 15 July Christie's furniture at Spencer House; 14 October Christie's ceramics)
- 1947 Apr 15 - May 20 (7) – Lowther Castle, Westmoreland for the 5th Earl of Lonsdale (Maple & Co.)
- 1941 July 14 - July 17 (4) — Camperdown House, Dundee, Scotland (the property of the late Countess of Buckinghamshire, formerly the Earl of Camperdown)
- 1938 Aug 29 - Sep 3 (6) - Gordon Castle, Moray for Charles Gordon-Lennox, 8th Duke of Richmond (Anderson & England)
- 1937 June 4 - Oct 19 (9) – Clumber, Nottinghamshire for the Earl of Lincoln (later 9th Duke of Newcastle), (Christies & Sothebys: library £70,000, other contents £60,000)
- 1934 July 23 - July 26 (4) - Brockhampton Park, Gloucestershire, estate of Colonel Fairfax Rhodes (Sotheby's)
- 1930 June 2- June 4 (3) – Hornby Castle, Yorkshire for the 11th Duke of Leeds (Sotheby & Co)
- 1929 Nov 05 - Nov 05 (1) – Herstmonceux Castle, East Sussex for Claude Lowther (Christies)
- 1922 Jun 12 - Jun 23 (10) — Cassiobury Park, Hertfordshire (Knight, Frank and Rutley, 2,606 lots)
- 1921 Oct ?? - Oct ?? (18) — Stowe House, second "Great Sale", including the house (Jackson-Stops, over 3,700 lots)
- 1919 Oct 13 - Oct 21 (7) - Singleton Abbey, Swansea (Knight, Frank and Rutley)
- 1917 Jul 23 - Jul 24 (2) - The Deepdene, Dorking, Surrey for Lord Francis Pelham-Clinton-Hope (later 8th Duke of Newcastle) (Christie's)
- 1892 May 21 & Nov 26 (2) - Silverton Park, from the estate of George Wyndham, 4th Earl of Egremont (Christie's)
- 1906 Nov 19 - Nov 24 (6) - Trentham Hall, Cheshire for Cromartie Sutherland-Leveson-Gower, 4th Duke of Sutherland (Sotheby's, 1787 lots, only the contents of the library)
- 1882 Jun 17 - July 20 (17) — Hamilton Palace, South Lanarkshire, Scotland (Christie, Manson, and Woods, 2,213 lots, raising £332,000 in the first 12 days; items not in situ, sold in London) Included large parts of the Beckford collections (see 1822)
- 1848 Aug 15 - Sep 30 (40) — Stowe House, Buckinghamshire, first "great sale" (Christie, Manson and Woods, £77,562)
- 1842 Apr 25 - June 23 (32) — Strawberry Hill, collection of Horace Walpole, 4th Earl of Orford, sold by his heir, George Waldegrave, 7th Earl Waldegrave (George Robins)
- 1822 Jun 10 - July 23 (32) — Wanstead House, London, to pay the debts of Catherine Tylney-Long's husband, the 4th Earl of Mornington (George Robins, 5,000 lots, £41,000)
- 1822 & re-auctioned 1823 — Fonthill Abbey, Wiltshire, sales by Christie's of the collections of William Beckford (see his article, and 1882 above)
- 1747 Jun 16 - Jun 27 (12) — Cannons, Middlesex, demolition sale of the structure and contents on the instruction of Henry Brydges, 2nd Duke of Chandos

== See also ==
- Sale of Irish country house contents
