= Young@Heart (film) =

- Theatrical release poster
- Directed by: Stephen Walker; Sally George (music videos)
- Produced by: Sally George
- Cinematography: Ed Marritz; Simon Poulter (music videos)
- Edited by: Chris King
- Distributed by: Fox Searchlight Pictures
- Release dates: 1 July 2007 (Los Angeles Film Festival); 9 April 2008 (United Kingdom)
- Running time: 107 minutes
- Country: United Kingdom
- Language: English

Young@Heart is a 2007 British documentary film set in Northampton, Massachusetts. It is about Young@Heart, a New England chorus of senior citizens that sings various rock and pop songs, and their rehearsals for their performances.

== Synopsis ==
Young@Heart, a chorus of twenty-four senior citizens with an average age of eighty, is directed by the genial, but demanding, Bob Cilman. In preparation for a concert in their hometown of Northampton, Massachusetts, and their next European tour, they spend seven weeks learning new songs by the likes of Sonic Youth, James Brown, Allen Toussaint, Coldplay, Jimi Hendrix, Talking Heads, and Prince, a task that is daunting for the members and frequently frustrating for Cilman. At one point, the chorus takes a break from rehearsals to perform at a nearby low-security prison, where they are figuratively, and then literally, embraced by the inmates. The passing of two members of the group in rapid succession only increases the determination of the remaining members to have the new material ready in time for the big show, and the concert proves to be a major success with the community.

== Production and release ==
The film was produced for British television network Channel 4 and later edited for its theatrical release. It premiered at the Los Angeles Film Festival in 2007, where it won the Audience Award for Best International Feature, and was shown at South by Southwest, the Florida Film Festival, and the Philadelphia International Film Festival before going into limited release in the United States in 2008.

== Box office performance ==
On 9 April 2008, the film opened in four theaters in the United States, grossing $50,937 its opening weekend. It eventually grossed a total of $3,992,189 in the US.

== Critical reception ==
Young@Heart received largely favorable reviews from critics. On review aggregator website Rotten Tomatoes, it has a 90% approval rating, based on 105 reviews, with the website's critics consensus reading, "Full of endearing characters, this doc about a choir of "seniors behaving badly" is uplifting and delightful." On Metacritic, it has a weighted average score of 75 out of 100, based on 23 reviews.

Stephen Holden of the New York Times wrote that "At moments the movie ... risks being a cloying, rose-colored study of happy old folks at play, and the cheer sounds forced. But the lives of the several members it examines at some depth are too real and complicated to resemble a commercial starring Wilford Brimley as a Norman Rockwell grandpa. The movie offers an encouraging vision of old age in which the depression commonly associated with decrepitude is held at bay by music making, camaraderie and a sense of humor."

Steve Davis of the Austin Chronicle gave the film 3½ out of four stars. He felt that, "despite an occasional lapse into nudge-nudge jokes about geriatric sex, incontinence, and the driving skills of the elderly," the film "eschews the clichés about old people for something that we can all relate to: our own mortality."

The film was named the best of the year by Marc Mohan of The Oregonian, and it appeared on several year-end top ten lists, including those of the New York Daily News and The Hollywood Reporter.

== Awards and nominations ==
In addition to the Audience Award at the Los Angeles Film Festival, the film won the Rose d'Or for Best Art Documentary and the Audience Awards at the Atlanta Film Festival and the Warsaw International Film Festival.

== Home release ==
20th Century Fox Home Entertainment released the film on DVD on 16 September 2008. This release is in anamorphic widescreen format, with audio tracks in English and Spanish and subtitles in English, Spanish, and French. Bonus features include: Young@Heart Goes to Hollywood (a short piece about the group performing at a theater in Hollywood), eight deleted scenes, and the full versions of two music videos that were shown in the film in an edited form (Young@Heart performing Talking Heads' "Road to Nowhere" and the group performing a medley of the Bee Gees' "Stayin' Alive" and Gloria Gaynor's "I Will Survive").

== See also ==
- Song for Marion (2012), a fictional film that deals with a choir of seniors performing contemporary music.
