= Ashurst Wood =

Village and parish in West Sussex, England

Coordinates: 51.111°N 0.027°E

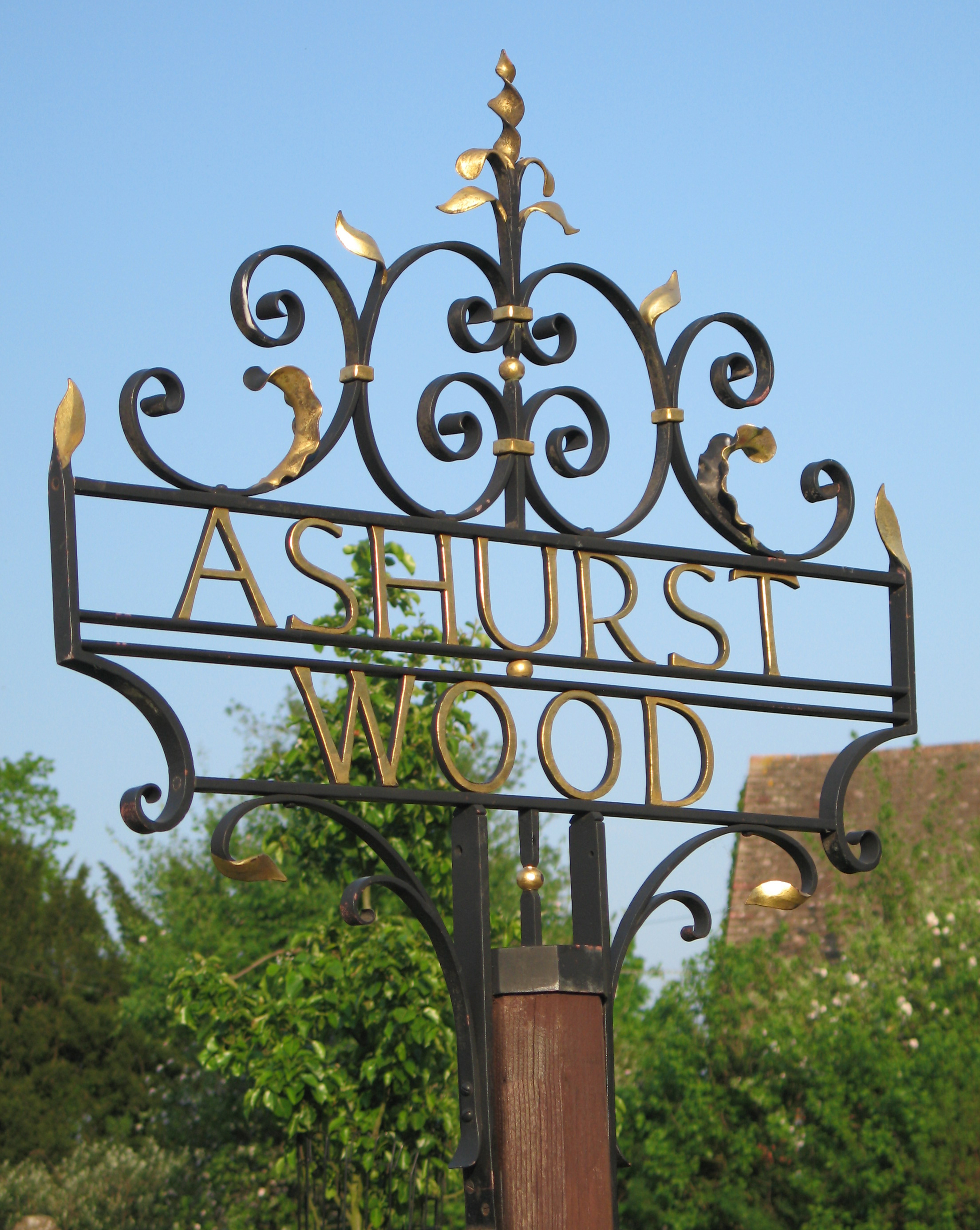

- Location within West Sussex
- Area: 2.51 km^{2} (0.97 sq mi)
- Population: 1,771 2001 Census; 1,833 (2011 Census)
  - Density: 705/km^{2} (1,830/sq mi)
- OS grid reference: TQ419365
  - London: 28 miles (45 km) NNW
- Civil parish: Ashurst Wood
- District: Mid Sussex
- Shire county: West Sussex
- Region: South East
- Country: England
- Sovereign state: United Kingdom
- Post town: EAST GRINSTEAD
- Postcode district: RH19
- Dialling code: 01342
- Police: Sussex
- Fire: West Sussex
- Ambulance: South East Coast
- UK Parliament: Mid Sussex
- Website: Village Council

Ashurst Wood is a village and civil parish in the Mid Sussex District of West Sussex, England. It is 1 mile (2 km) to the southeast of East Grinstead, just off the A22 arterial road. In 2001, the population was 1,771, increasing to 1,833 at the 2011 Census. Ashurst Wood is within the High Weald Area of Natural Beauty and has a Site of Special Scientific Interest (SSSI) inside its boundaries. The village has a history of agriculture and farming, and contains a church, village hall, primary school, two public houses, a general shop, post office and several small business premises. There is an independent school on the boundary of the village, called Brambletye School, and a former one, Stoke Brunswick School (the former junior school of British Prime Minister Winston Churchill), which closed in 2009. Bus routes run through the village with destinations of East Grinstead, Crawley, Haywards Heath, Tunbridge Wells and Brighton.

== History ==
The date of when the village was formed is not known. Two of the main roads in the village and Lewes Road (now part of the A22) were used as a ridge-way track for animals and people 5,000 years ago. There is evidence of a Roman ironworks in the village. By 1066, the area had two established farms, the tracks between them are still in use today as roads. The name of Ashurst Wood dates back to 1164 when the region was known as Aesehyrst Wilde. There was no village then and the name was used for a common area. During the reign of Henry II, the area that is now Ashurst Wood was called, Esseherst. The names Aisherst, Askhurst and Eseherst were in use in the years 1186, 1248 and 1279 respectively. Around 1300 a house was built, part of which remains as the Headmaster's drawing room in Stoke Brunswick School, and has been designated by English Heritage as a grade II* listed building. By the time of the reign of Elizabeth I, Ashurst Wood had prosperous farms, with Water Farmhouse being built in the 16th century, Great Surries dating from the 17th century, and its barn being slightly more recent. The population grew and more houses were built in the village. in 1855, the nearby town of East Grinstead was connected to London by rail, and another rail connection to the area in 1884 meant that Ashurst Wood was more accessible. Many wealthy people bought property in the area and this provided work other than that of the agricultural type.

=== Modern history ===
The village school began in new premises built for 240 children on 30 September 1910. It is still in use as the primary school. During World War I, many villagers volunteered to serve in the armed forces. Back in the village efforts to help the war included making sandbags to be sent to the front. In 1931, construction was complete on St Dunstan's Hall, which is now the Village Centre. The hall was immediately put to good use for many activities by villagers. Ashurst Wood experienced World War II first hand with bullets from planes hitting the school. Dogfights were regularly seen in the skies above and around the village, and buildings that used to be part of Stoke Brunswick School were used for nursing allied airmen. In 1944, the village was hit by a series of V-1 flying bombs, Doodlebugs, leaving craters that are still visible today. Since the Second World War, the village has been expanded by suburban development. In December 1978, construction started on the United Reformed Church in the village to convert it into the new and current St. Dunstan's Church. The work was completed in Summer 1979 and dedicated in September by the Bishop of Horsham. The lease for St. Dunstan's Hall was taken over by the Ashurst Wood Community Association from the church and became the Village Centre in 1980. The hall was then renovated by local builders and has since been put to use by youth clubs, local theatre and many more activities.

==== Governance history ====
In the 1870s the ecclesiastical parish of Forest Row was formed and much of Ashurst Wood was included in its governing. In 1894 the civil parish of Forest Row was formed and the village was a ward within this parish, in the administrative county of East Sussex. In 1934 the village was transferred from the Forest Row parish council to the East Grinstead Urban District Council then in East Sussex. Under the 1974 local government reorganisation, East Grinstead Urban District Council was abolished with a new parish authority East Grinstead Town Council formed within the new Mid Sussex District. Under these changes the East Grinstead parish was also moved from East to West Sussex. Ashurst Wood was then governed by East Grinstead Town Council until 2000.

Up until 1992 Ashurst Wood was split by the administrative boundary of East and West Sussex, which meant parts of the village were under the control of Forest Row Parish Council and other parts East Grinstead Town Council. A plan to transfer land on the East Sussex part over to West Sussex County Council was submitted to the Secretary of State for the Environment, and in 1993 the boundary changes came into force.

In 2000, Ashurst Wood became a civil parish and a parish council was formed. Ashurst Wood Village Council is the official elected body of local government representatives for the civil parish of Ashurst Wood, having changed its name from Ashurst Wood Parish Council on 1 January 2016. There are nine councillors. The Village Council meets ten times per year and meetings can be attended by the public. In 2000, Ashurst Wood became a civil parish and a parish council was formed.

Ashurst Wood is now in the District of Mid Sussex (within the county of West Sussex). Most of Mid Sussex District was within the Mid Sussex parliamentary constituency. Following boundary changes in 2024, the village became part of the new East Grinstead and Uckfield parliamentary constituency.

In 2005 a committee formed with the aim of creating an action plan to implement progress for the village. In 2006 a comprehensive questionnaire was produced and given to the villagers to ascertain what actions should be taken. 55% of the questionnaires were returned and general population data recorded by this questionnaire echoed the findings of the 2001 census. The questionnaire resulted in a document called the Ashurst Wood – Village Action Plan which was published in April 2007. The document contained time scales for targets and actions that would be taken.

==== Unofficial independence declaration ====
To celebrate the millennium, in January 2000 some residents of Ashurst Wood unofficially declared independence from the United Kingdom. The new state was known as The People's Republic of Ashurst Wood, a Nation State, which gave the acronym P.R.A.W.N.S. This was reported in the local and national media, notably by the radio DJ Chris Moyles during his show on BBC Radio 1.

The "revolution" was said to be justified because of a ruling by King Ethelred in the year 979, specifying that the village of Ashurst Wood would be immune from taxation after he fell ill there.

=== The Ashurst Wood Neighbourhood Plan ===
In the September 2015 the Village Council submitted the Ashurst Wood Neighbourhood Plan 2015–2031 to Mid Sussex District Council, with a view to its adoption as a statutory planning document.

The plan's Vision is: "To preserve and protect Ashurst Wood's characteristics as a rural village, while at the same time ensuring that it remains a vibrant, safe, and welcoming community, and an attractive location for people to live."

== Demography ==
At the time of the United Kingdom Census 2001, there were 2,784 residents in the ward of Ashurst Wood, which includes the parish plus the south east section of the East Grinstead parish. At the 2001 census, Ashurst Wood was slightly less diverse ethnically than the national average. 96.5% of the village residents were white, 1.6% were of mixed race, 1% Asian, 0.1% Black, 0.4% Chinese and 0.4% were of other ethnicity. The village was fractionally more diverse than the regional average. The mean age for residents of the village is 39 and the median age is 38. Figures released in 2006 and 2007 show that crime in the village is lower than the national averages. There are no robberies per one thousand people, 4.7 burglaries per thousand and 7.5 vehicle thefts per thousand.

For the 2001 census, some of the people of Ashurst Wood indicated their religion. 71.8% stated their religion as Christian, 0.43% as Buddhist, 0.32% as Hindu, 0.36% as Jewish, 1.26% as Muslim, 0% as Sikh, 1.04% as other religions, 17.28% indicated they had no religion and 7.51% did not state their religion. The majority of residents are economically active. 43.91% and 14.12% of the population are in full and part-time employment. 12.08% of residents are self-employed and 1.28% are unemployed. This figure is lower than the local, regional and national percentages of unemployment. Economically inactive residents are made up of 13.1% retired, 3.28% students, 5.22% looking after their home or family, 2.1% permanently sick or disabled and 1.94% are economically inactive for other reasons.

== Geography ==
Ashurst Wood is situated on a prominent ridge 1 mile (2 km) to the southeast of East Grinstead and is 400 feet (122 m) above sea level, This means the area is not prone to heavy flooding. Several farms are within the boundaries of the village which keep various livestock such as sheep and pigs, but Ashurst Wood is primarily a residential village.

The village primarily stands on Tunbridge Wells Sand and Wadhurst Clay. The combination of permeable and impermeable types creates an abundance of streams and springs in woodland areas. These are known Ghyll springs and streams, and are common in the High Weald.

Mills Rocks in the north of the village is a Site of Special Scientific Interest. It is an area consisting of outcrops of sandstone, and is currently designated as Unfavourable recovering, which means that it is not yet fully conserved but all the necessary management measures are in place. Provided that the recovery work is sustained, the SSSI will reach favourable condition in time.

== Community facilities ==
=== Education ===
There are two schools in Ashurst Wood: a state primary school and an independent junior school.

Ashurst Wood Primary School is a co-educational, non-denominational state school for children aged four to eleven years, and has been in its current location since 1910. At the 2006 Ofsted inspection, there were 116 pupils enrolled at the school. In the Ofsted report, the school received satisfactory grades in the overall Inspection Judgements. In 2006, Ashurst Wood Primary School received the International School Award. To receive this award, the school is involved in an international link with Mervin Iverson Elementary in Las Vegas, United States. Members of staff have visited each school and the students are in contact with each other and are involved in joint activities.

Brambletye School is an independent co-educational day and boarding school for pupils aged seven to thirteen years. The school's grounds cover 140 acres (0.57 km^{2}) to the south west of the village. The preparatory school has been coeducational since 2000 but the pre-prep school has always accepted girls. In 2001, the Independent Schools Inspectorate found that there were 206 pupils at the school, 99 of which are boarding there. The ISI report findings showed that the school was doing very well with small room for improvement. In 2012 the ISI reported that "The school does not meet all the National Minimum Standards for Boarding Schools".

The former Stoke Brunswick School, although having a postal address of Ashurst Wood, was outside the parish.

=== Sports and recreation ===
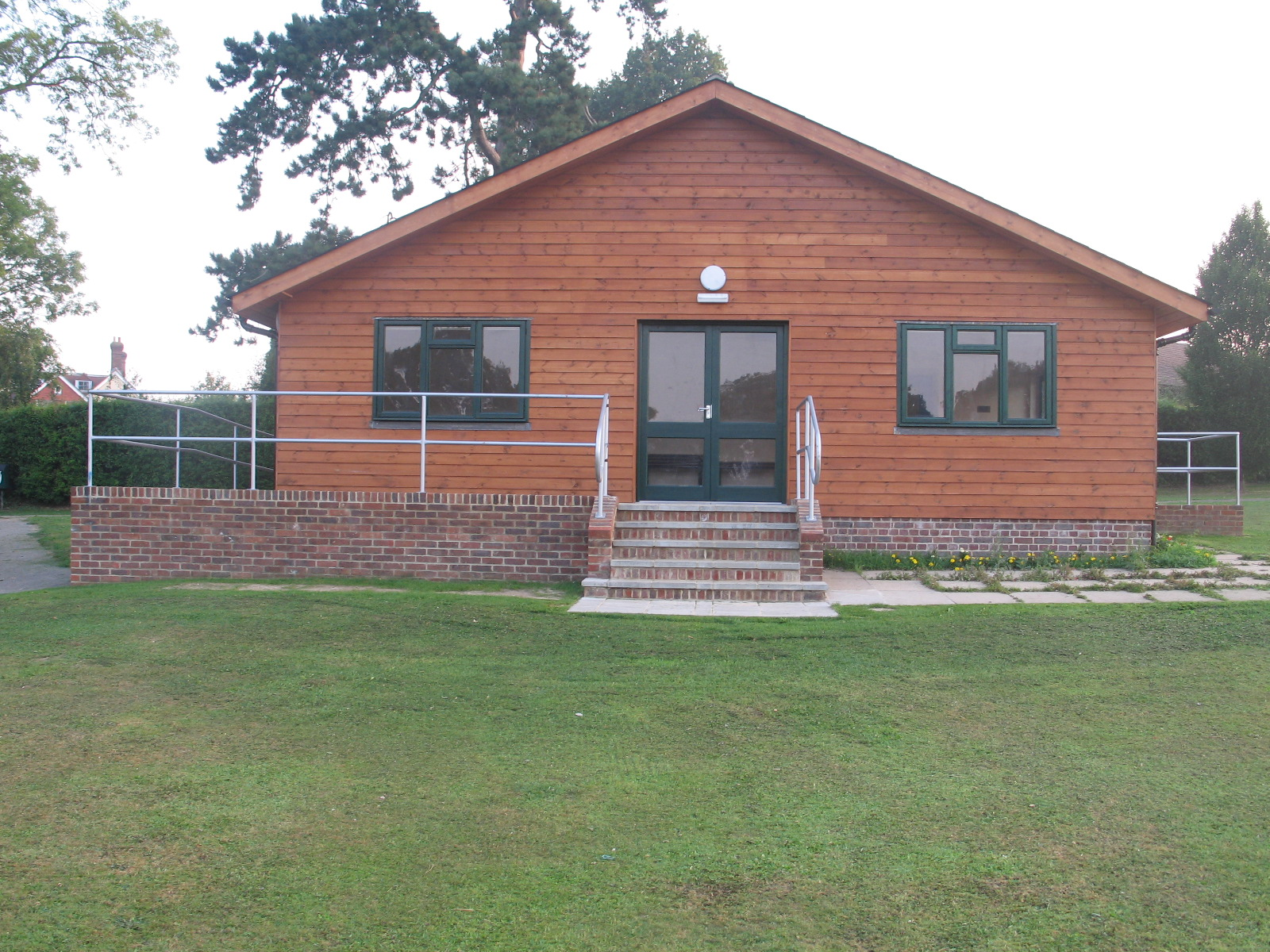
The John Pears Field pavilion.

The John Pears Recreation Field and The Recreation Ground are the two recreational fields in Ashurst Wood. John Pears Recreation Field became council property when it was donated by local resident Mrs Pears as a memorial to her husband. The land covers just over two hectares and contains a pavilion, barbecue for public use, a tennis area, fenced-off play area and a basketball hoop. The field is maintained by the local council. The field used to be home to the Strawberry Fair which was an annual event held in the village, the first of which took place in 1978 and was opened by BBC Radio 2 DJ Don Moss. In 2003 the pavilion was burnt down in an act of arson. After some fundraising, steps were made to have a new one built. Construction was completed in 2005 and opened on 2 June. In more recent times the field has been used for "Ashstock", the annual village beer and music festival featuring local youth talent and real ale.

The other recreational field known locally as The Rec, is where the Mid-Sussex Football League division 2 team Ashurst Wood F.C. plays its home games. The team was formed around the early 1920s. The recreation ground was also home to the village cricket team which had been running for over 100 years, but folded due to lack of participants in 1999.

The Ashurst Wood Village Centre is a village hall which hosts dance, carpet bowls and the annual Christmas Market and Village Meeting. A recent addition to the Village Centre is the Ashurst Wood Village Council Offices and Meeting Room.

=== Other facilities ===
Ashurst Wood is served by Metrobus bus services, with destinations of Crawley, Royal Tunbridge Wells and Uckfield. There is a community funded bus service called EG Bus that provides a ride to East Grinstead for the elderly and disabled. The bus picks up people from various places in the village to take them to East Grinstead and relies on volunteer drivers. In the village there is Allan Martin Meats (formally Clifton Spencer from 1954 to 1987), an award-winning butchers shop. In 2008 the butchers provided meat for television chef Gordon Ramsay for a programme aired on Channel 4.
