= Young@Heart Chorus =

Musical ensemble

- Young@Heart Chorus (with director Bob Cilman) rehearsing in 2024.

Background information
- Origin: Northampton, MA, U.S.

Young@Heart, also Young@Heart Chorus, is an entertainment group created by and for the elderly, comprised at present of people at least 70 years of age. Some have prior professional theater or music experience, others have performed at amateur level, and some have no experience whatsoever. They are particularly noted for their unconventional covers of rock, punk, and other modern pop music songs.

Founded in 1982 in Northampton, Massachusetts, by Bob Cilman, the members all lived in an elderly housing project, The Walter Salvo House. The first group included elders who lived through both World Wars. One had fought in the Battle of the Somme as a 16-year-old and another, Anna Main, a stand-up comic, lost her husband in the First World War. Main stayed with the group until she was 100 years old. Diamond Lillian Aubrey, who performed with the first two European tours, performed Manfred Mann's "Doo Wah Diddy". In later years, she appeared "on stage" via video, performing the Rolling Stones' "You Can't Always Get What You Want".

In early 1984, Warren Clark, Ralph Intorcio, and Eileen Hall joined the Chorus. Warren and Ralph did female impersonations (Warren took on the persona of Sophie Tucker, and Ralph did a send-up of Carol Channing's "Diamonds Are a Girl's Best Friend"), while Eileen, originally from London, brought an array of different routines, including strip, mime, and the song "Nobody Loves a Fairy When She's...Ninety". The group joined with a group of Latino breakdancers from a local housing project, resulting in Boola Bimini Bop, the first of many collaborations created with different arts groups in town. A few others included: Oh No a Condo (1988) with Cambodian folk artists and punk rockers; Louis Lou I – A Revolting Musical (1991), a re-telling of the French Revolution using Frank Sinatra's songs; and Flaming Saddles (1994) with the Pioneer Valley Gay Men's Chorus.

In 1996, the Young@Heart Chorus performed in Rotterdam, and they did twelve more tours in Europe, Australia, and Canada between 1997 and 2004.

The first documentary film about the Chorus, Forever Young at Heart, premiered at the Northampton Film Festival in Northampton, Massachusetts—the group's hometown—in 2000. Produced by Barbara Allen of Wildrose Productions, the film chronicled the early years of Young@Heart.

Another documentary film about the Chorus appeared on Britain's Channel 4 in 2007. A feature-length version of this documentary was released theatrically in April 2008 by Fox Searchlight Pictures. Group member Fred Knittle, who sang Coldplay's "Fix You" in the film and was a frequent source of comic relief, died on January 1, 2009, from cancer. He was 83.

Bob Cilman is still the director of the Chorus
