= Stephen Walker (filmmaker) =

British author and filmmaker

- Occupations: Author and Filmmaker
- Known for: Beyond: The Astonishing Story of the First Human to Leave Our Planet and Journey Into Space, Shockwave: Countdown to Hiroshima

Stephen Walker is a British author and filmmaker. He was educated at Oxford and Harvard universities. He has directed or produced around 30 films, and was twice voted in the top 10 directors in the UK in Broadcast magazine. His production company is Walker George Films. His author website is Stephen Walker Beyond.

== Writing ==
His first book, King of Cannes: Madness, Mayhem and the Movies (1999) was published by Bloomsbury and Penguin USA in 2000. Based on his BBC documentary Waiting for Harvey, it was described by The Guardian as “entertaining and hilarious.”

Shockwave: Countdown to Hiroshima (2005) his second book, tells the story of the three months before the dropping of the atomic bomb in August 1945. It was published by HarperCollins, winning favourable comparisons to John Hersey's classic postwar account Hiroshima. It received starred reviews from Booklist, Publishers Weekly and Kirkus Reviews and was described as “electrifying” (Chicago Tribune), "a page-turner" (Entertainment Weekly), and "stunning…among the most immediate and thrilling works of history I have ever read." (The Irish Times) Shockwave is currently in development as a TV Series with Working Title Films. Screenwriters have included Tom Stoppard and Oscar-nominated Hossein Amini. The book was republished with an updated introduction by HarperCollins in 2020 for the 75th anniversary of the dropping of the atomic bomb on Hiroshima.

Walker's most recent non-fiction book Beyond: The Astonishing Story of the First Human to Leave Our Planet and Journey Into Space is set at the heart of the Cold War in the spring of 1961 when the US and the USSR raced to put the first human into space. The book was published in 2021 by HarperCollins in the US and UK to mark the 60th anniversary of Yuri Gagarin's successful orbit of the Earth, the first human in history to do so. Beyond was described by The Sunday Times as "a thrilling piece of storytelling," by The Financial Times as "thrilling, fresh and new," and by The Wall Street Journal as ""vividly told." It was picked by The Daily Telegraph as one of their Books of the Year. Beyond is also currently in development as a six-part TV series with Working Title Films. The screenwriter is John Collee, who also wrote the Oscar-nominated Peter Weir movie Master and Commander, starring Russell Crowe.

== Film and television ==
He has won a BAFTA, and was nominated for three further BAFTAs (including Best Documentary and Best Director) for his Channel 4 documentary, A Boy Called Alex, a film about a music prodigy at Eton College, who suffers from the disease cystic fibrosis, was described by The Guardian as "glorious." He has also won an Emmy and two Rose d'Ors, Europe's most prestigious television prize. His film Young@Heart, the tale of a chorus of American seniors who sing rock music, won the Audience Award at the Los Angeles Film Festival in 2007 and went on to win a further 23 film festival audience awards worldwide, including in Paris, Sydney, Warsaw, Nashville, and Atlanta. Young@Heart was released in 250 theatres by Fox Searchlight in the US in 2008. A key scene from the movie where the late octogenarian Fred Knittle sings Coldplay's "Fix You" has had 2.8 million hits on YouTube.

== Education and personal life ==
Stephen Walker was educated at St Paul's School, London, and Worcester College, Oxford, where he gained a BA in modern history. He subsequently won a John Lounsbery Fellowship to study as a postgraduate at Harvard University, receiving a master's degree in philosophy and history of science, before joining the BBC.

His former partner is the television producer and director Sally George. He lives in London and has one daughter. In his spare time, he flies a tiny plane for recreation.

== Filmography ==
- Prisoners in Time (1995)
- Jewish Wedding (1996)
- Waiting for Harvey (1999)
- Hardcore (2001)
- Faking It: Punk Rocker to Orchestra Conductor (2002)
- Hiroshima – A Day That Shook The World (2005) (drama-documentary)
- A Boy Called Alex (2007)
- Young@Heart (2007)
- Silver Surfers (2007)
- George Melly’s Last Stand (2008)
- Operation Mincemeat (2010) Presented by Ben Macintyre
- The Real Magnificent Men in their Flying Machines (Propellerheads) (2011)
- DOUBLE AGENT: The Eddie Chapman Story (2011) Presented by Ben Macintyre
- The Day I Got My Sight Back (2013)
