= John Massy, 6th Baron Massy =

John Thomas William Massy, 6th Baron Massy (30 August 1835 – 1915) was an Anglo-Irish peer.

He was an Irish representative peer in the House of Lords from 1876 to 1915. He was appointed Sheriff of Leitrim for 1863 and Sheriff of County Limerick in 1873.

He succeeded to his title following the death of his older brother, Hugh Massy, 5th Baron Massy, in 1874. He was one of Ireland's wealthiest landowners at the time, having large properties in Counties Leitrim, Dublin, Limerick and Tipperary. This included large country houses at Killakee in south Co. Dublin, and Hermitage in Castleconnell, Co. Limerick. However, by the time of his death in 1915, his fortune had been reduced to almost nothing, and subsequently, all his estates were sold by his successors, the 7th and 8th Barons Massy, or were repossessed by the banks.

Political offices
Preceded by The Viscount de Vesci	Representative peer for Ireland; 1876–1915	Succeeded by The Earl of Kilmorey
Peerage of Ireland
Preceded by Hugh Massy	Baron Massy; 1874–1915	Succeeded by Hugh Massy
