= Killakee House =

Demolished Georgian House in South County Dublin, Ireland

Coordinates: 53.2538°N 6.3214°W

Kilakee House
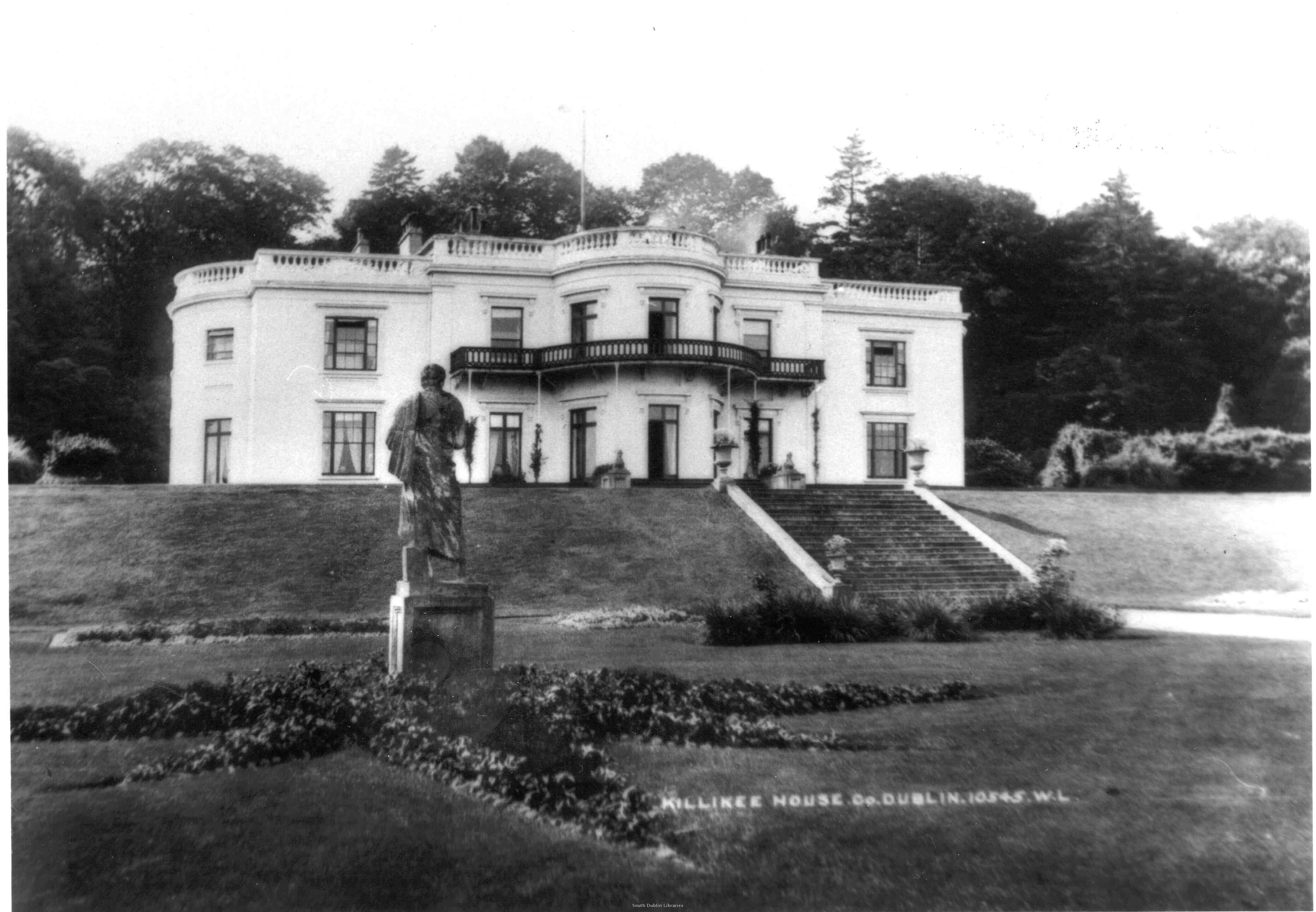
- Kilakee House circa 1900

- Location within Dublin

General information
- Status: Demolished
- Type: House
- Architectural style: Georgian
- Location: Rathfarnham, County Dublin, Ireland
- Completed: 1806
- Demolished: 1941

Technical details
- Floor count: 3

Design and construction
- Architects: Richard Turner (conservatory); Ninian Niven (gardens)
- Developer: Luke White

Killakee House was a large Georgian house and estate near Rathfarnham in County Dublin, Ireland. It was built in c.1806 for Luke White, an Irish politician and bookseller and was the centrepiece of a 3,400-acre estate, but was demolished in 1941 after many years of vacancy.

The original estate included a hunting lodge now known as the Hell fire club.

== History ==
In 1800 Luke White purchased land at Killakee from the wealthy Conolly family. Around 1806 he developed Killakee House, a two-storey, thirty-six-roomed stucco-faced house. It had a Tuscan-columned entrance and large three-windowed bows on the back and sides.

After Luke White died, his son Samuel inherited the house and estate in 1824. In 1838, he engaged the services of Sir Ninian Niven, former director of the Botanic Gardens in Dublin. Niven laid out two Victorian formal gardens of gravel walks, terraces and exotic trees decorated with statues of Greek and Roman gods. Adjacent to the house was a terraced rose garden with a statue of Neptune. A second walled garden in a vale in the woods below the house contained more fountains and a range of glasshouses designed by Richard Turner.

When Samuel White's widow, Anne, died in 1880, she bequeathed the estate to her late husband's nephew, John Massy, 6th Baron Massy. The Massys were a Protestant Ascendancy family whose ancestors had come to Ireland in 1641 and owned extensive lands in County Limerick, County Leitrim and County Tipperary. Massy often used the house to entertain visitors while shooting game at Cruagh and Glendoo and to host parties. Lord Massy employed a small army of staff, ranging from coachmen, stablemen, house servants, gardeners, cooks, and gamekeepers. During shooting expeditions, large dining shelters would be set up in the woods, where shooting parties would adjourn for lunch. Tables would be laid out there with the finest tableware, and food would be transported in pony carts from Killakee House. It was during this time that the family’s riches reached their peak, and when it started to decline. By the time Lord Massy died in 1915, the estate was hopelessly in debt to the bank.

John Thomas’s grandson, Hugh Hamon Massy, next inherited Killakee. Hamon Massy was faced with a serious crisis, with the magnificent gardens alone requiring a large number of outdoor workers and gardeners. Massy still attended social events and drove around in the last of his grandfather’s motor cars, but by 1919, huge quantities of silver plates, jewellery, furniture, and a large art collection were sold in an auction that lasted several days. It soon became clear to the bank that the family were unable to deal with their financial problems.

=== IRA base ===
For a period during the Irish War of Independence the house and grounds were used as a base, shooting range and munitions store for the Irish Republican Army.

=== Repossession and demolition ===
In May 1924 an officer and two assistants arrived to take possession of Killakee House. Massey, who was unwell, was lifted out of the house on his mattress and deposited on the nearby public road. The incident was widely reported in the national newspapers and the bank soon placed a caretaker in the house. By agreement with the bank, the family was later permitted to take possession of Beehive Cottage, a three-roomed gate lodge located near the gate to Killakee House. For thirty-four years following his eviction, he was regularly seen collecting timber for his kitchen fire in the nearby woods. In 1941 the bank, unable to find a buyer, sold the house to a builder who salvaged what was left of the Killakee House. Having removed the slates, timbers and floors, the builder demolished the house, in the sight of Hamon Massy who was still living in the nearby gatehouse. The woods were taken over by the forestry department and Massy was employed in a charcoal-making business in the nearby forest.

== Current status ==
No substantial remains of Killakee House exist today, and the estate gardens are mostly overgrown and in a state of dereliction.

Beehive Cottage, among the other gate lodges, survives today. The lands were eventually acquired by the State and opened to the public. In the late 1930s, the Director of Forestry, laid out the area as a forest, sometimes known as Lord Massey's Wood. The Killakee Woods are now in the care of Coillte.

The woods today are known as a place for birdwatching with species including the Great Spotted Woodpecker. Other bird species recorded there which are rare breeders in Ireland include the common redstart and the wood warbler.

== See also ==
- Montpelier Hill
- Sale of Irish country house contents
