= Baron Massy =

Barony Massy
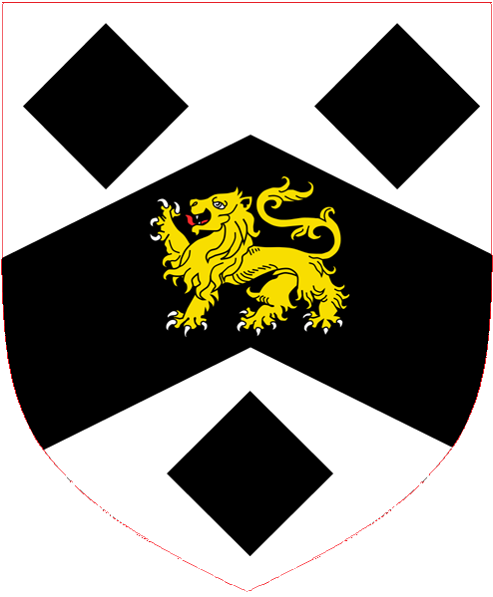
- Arms: Argent, on a chevron between three lozenges Sable, a lion passant Or. Crest: Out of a ducal coronet Or, a bull’s head Gules; armed Sable. Supporters: Dexter, a lion; sinister a leopard reguardant; both Proper and collared and chained Or.
- Creation date: 29 June 1776
- Created by: King George III
- Peerage: Peerage of Ireland
- First holder: Hugh Massy
- Present holder: David Massy
- Heir presumptive: John Massy
- Remainder to: The 1st Baron's heirs male of the body lawfully begotten
- Status: Extant
- Seat: Killakee
- Motto: Pro Libertate Patriae (For The Liberty Of My Country)

Baron Massy, of Duntryleague in the County of Limerick, is a title in the Peerage of Ireland. It was created on 4 August 1776 for Hugh Massy, who had previously represented County Limerick in the Irish House of Commons. His son, the second Baron, also represented this constituency in the Irish Parliament. His great-grandson, the sixth Baron, sat in the House of Lords as an Irish representative peer from 1876 to 1915. He left such heavy debts that in 1924 the family were evicted from their home.

As of 2014 the title is held by the latter's great-great-grandson, the tenth Baron, who succeeded his father in 1995.

Eyre Massey, 1st Baron Clarina, was the younger brother of the first Baron Massy.

The family seat was Killakee House, near Rathfarnham, County Dublin. The house was demolished in 1941, but the Killakee estate, popularly known as Lord Massey's Wood, is now a much valued public amenity. Another seat from the 1790s was Hermitage House in Castleconnell, County Limerick, until it was burnt in June 1920, being demolished in the 1970s.

== Barons Massy (1776) ==
- Hugh Massy, 1st Baron Massy (1700–1788)
- Hugh Massy, 2nd Baron Massy (1733–1790)
- Hugh Massy, 3rd Baron Massy (1761–1812)
- Hugh Hamon Massy, 4th Baron Massy (1793–1836)
- Hugh Hamon Ingoldsby Massy, 5th Baron Massy (1827–1874)
- John Thomas William Massy, 6th Baron Massy (1835–1915)
- Hugh Somerset John Massy, 7th Baron Massy (1864–1926)
- Hugh Hamon Charles George Massy, 8th Baron Massy (1894–1958)
- Hugh Hamon John Somerset Massy, 9th Baron Massy (1921–1995)
- David Harmon Somerset Massy, 10th Baron Massy (born 1947)

The heir presumptive is the present holder's brother Hon. John Hugh Somerset Massy (born 1950). His heir apparent is his son Luke John Somerset Massy (born 1984).

== See also ==
- Baron Clarina
- Massey Baronets
