= Stoke Brunswick School =

Location
- Ashurst Wood; East Grinstead, West Sussex, RH19 3PF; England
- Coordinates: 51.11882°N 0.03005°E

Information
- Type: Other Independent School
- Religious affiliation: Christian
- Closed: 2009
- Local authority: West Sussex
- Department for Education URN: 114667 Tables
- Gender: Coeducational
- Age: 2 to 12
- Enrolment: 138 (when closed)
- Website: http://www.stokebrunswick.co.uk

Stoke Brunswick School was a small co-educational day and boarding independent school for children aged 3 to 13 years, situated in Ashurst Wood, West Sussex, near the town of East Grinstead. It was the former junior school (after St. George's School in Ascot, Berkshire), of British Prime Minister Winston Churchill (then known as Brunswick School and located in Hove, neighbouring Brighton). The last headmaster was Richard Taylor, who took over from Mark Ellerton in 2005. Before closing, the school had 138 pupils. Stoke Brunswick School closed in the summer of 2009 because the forecast pupil intake for September was "not adequate".

Despite their best efforts to secure the school's future, including a six figure financial pledge, the parents fell just short of numbers for it to continue.

== History ==
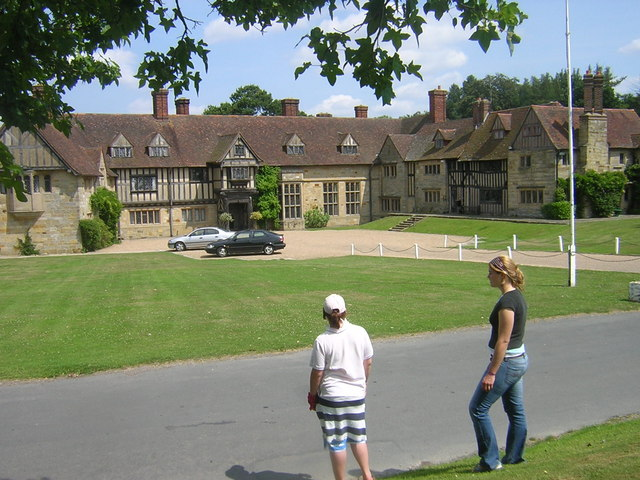

The oldest wing of the building, in which the Headmaster resided, dates back to the 14th century and was a hunting lodge belonging to John of Gaunt. The rest of building, built in the 17th century, was originally situated in Cheshire and was called Dutton Hall. It was transported piece by piece to its current location, Homestall, in the 1930s by the Dewar family.

During World War II, it was used by the Red Cross to house military casualties, including burned aircrew (members of the Guinea Pig Club) recovering from surgeries performed by Archibald McIndoe and his plastic surgery team at nearby Queen Victoria Hospital in East Grinstead. One of the pilots staying here was Richard Hillary, a Spitfire pilot who in 1942 wrote a best-selling book, The Last Enemy, which has been in print ever since.

It became an all-boys school after WWII. The school became co-educational in 1964.

== Grounds ==
The school was situated in the idyllic setting of the Sussex countryside. There were 30 acres (120,000 m^{2}) of grounds for the children to play in. 11 acres (45,000 m^{2}) of these 30 were mainly woodland, in which the children would play at breaktimes in summer.

== Facilities ==
The school had 28 classrooms. There was a chemistry lab, a library, a newly refurbished gymnasium, a chapel, a swimming pool, 8 playing fields, a 9-hole golf course, extensive dyslexia facilities, a pre-prep school and a network of computers for teachers and pupils alike to use.

== Music ==
The school had a reputation as one of the most musical in the area. The last head of music was Caroline Long, who took over from Sue Barber in 2006. She taught the pupils using the Kodály method. The school choir often reached the semi-finals of Children's Choir of the Year, and participated in Glyndebourne operatic productions numerous times. All of the pupils were encouraged to learn a musical instrument and sing. The successful drum group performed at numerous prestigious locations, and reached the finals of the Music for Youth competition at the Royal Festival Hall for the last two consecutive years. The Stoke Brunswick choir was well known by many in the area.

== Sport ==
Stoke Brunswick offered a wide range of sports and encouraged participation whatever the individual's abilities. Even though the teams were chosen on individual merit, the school held swimming galas and sports days to get all of the pupils involved. The pupils at the school played a wide variety of sports, including: Rugby, Hockey, Tennis, Netball, Lacrosse, Cricket, Basketball, Softball, Rounders, Athletics and Football (Soccer).

== Headmasters ==
- John Bartlett, 1965–1981
- Mark Ellerton, 1981–2005
- Richard Taylor, 2005–2009

== Notable alumni ==
- Winston Churchill, former British Prime Minister and war-time leader
- Alex Stobbs, academic and music scholar
- Jonathan King, record producer, singer and songwriter
