= Alex Stobbs =

British musician (born 1990)

- Born: Alexander Brett Stobbs; 30 January 1990 (age 36); Tunbridge Wells, Kent, England, United Kingdom
- Occupations: Conductor and musician
- Years active: 2009-present

Alexander Brett Stobbs (born 30 January 1990 in Tunbridge Wells, Kent, England) is a British musician. He was featured in the Channel 4 documentary series "Cutting Edge" (TV series) in the episodes A Boy Called Alex (2008) and Alex: A Passion for Life (2009). Stobbs has cystic fibrosis, a condition that was documented in both films.

== Early life ==
After completing his academic and musical studies at Stoke Brunswick, Stobbs joined the Choir of King's College, Cambridge. During his time as a chorister, he participated in a recording of Johann Sebastian Bach's Magnificat with King's College for EMI, a piece he would later conduct. He also studied music as a choral scholar at King's College.

On 5 April 2009, he conducted Bach's St Matthew Passion at Cadogan Hall in London, featuring the Rodolfus Choir and Southbank Sinfonia. Stobbs took early inspiration from the works of Walter de la Mare and British novelist J. K. Rowling. He continued his music education as a scholar at Eton College, where he conducted Bach's Magnificat in March 2007.

In September 2009, he published A Passion for Living, a diary detailing his experiences during his A-levels and his preparation for performing Bach's St Matthew Passion. In July 2018, Stobbs received third prize in the Joan Chissell Schumann Prize for Piano at the Royal College of Music.

== Documentaries ==
Stobbs has been featured in two television documentaries. Both were directed by Paddy Wivell, produced by Walker George Films, and were broadcast on Channel 4.

The first, A Boy Called Alex, followed Alex's efforts to conduct Bach's Magnificat while living with cystic fibrosis. It aired in 2008 and received a BAFTA nomination in 2009.

The second documentary, titled Alex: A Passion for Life, was broadcast in October 2009. It documented Stobbs' first year at King's College, Cambridge, as he prepared to conduct Bach's St Matthew Passion with a full orchestra in the Cadogan Hall, highlighting his experiences with cystic fibrosis.

He appeared on the UK talk show Richard & Judy in January 2008, performing Rachmaninov's Prelude in G-sharp minor, Op. 32/12.
