= Hermitage House =

Former Georgian house in County Limerick, Ireland

Hermitage House was a large Georgian mansion in Castleconnell, County Limerick, Ireland. It was built circa 1800 for George Evans Bruce (1782-1868), a local banker who was subsequently disgraced following the collapse of various Limerick banks in which he was a partner including Charlieville Bank and Bruce's Bank.

It was situated in a spectacular location overlooking the Falls of Doonass on the River Shannon and was said to be an imposing structure of 37 rooms. It was a 5 bay structure with four large corinthian pilasters supporting a smaller pediment at the front of the three story over basement building while there was a stone balustrade along the front parapet of the house with a stone urn at its centre.

It became the home of several generations of Lords Massy from 1807 until 1915, and was subsequently destroyed by fire during the Irish War of Independence.

The ruins stood until the 1970s, when they were demolished.

Various archaeological finds have been discovered at the estate. including a fulacht fiadh close to what was a fording point of the River Shannon.

== Sources ==
- Tracy, Frank If those Trees could Speak: the story of an Ascendancy Family in Ireland
- Carroll, Joe & Touhy, Pat (1991) Village by Shannon: the Story of Castleconnell and its Hinterland
