= Thomas Southwell =

Thomas Southwell may refer to:

- Thomas Southwell (priest) (fl. 1420s–1440s), Canon of Windsor
- Thomas Southwell (died 1568), English landowner and courtier
- Thomas Southwell (died 1643), English landowner
- Thomas Southwell (Jesuit), pseudonym of Thomas Bacon (1592–1637), English-born Jesuit priest, teacher, and theologian
- Sir Thomas Southwell, 1st Baronet (died 1680), Anglo-Irish politician
- Thomas Southwell, 1st Baron Southwell (1665–1720), Irish MP for Limerick County 1695–1713 and 1715–1717, Commissioner of the Revenue
- Thomas Southwell, 2nd Baron Southwell (1698–1766), his son, Irish MP for Limerick County 1717–1720
- Thomas Southwell, 1st Viscount Southwell (1721–1788), his son, Irish MP for Enniscorthy and Limerick County 1761–1766
- Thomas Southwell, 2nd Viscount Southwell (1742–1796), his son, Irish MP for Limerick County 1767–1780
- Thomas Southwell, 3rd Viscount Southwell (1777–1860), his son, Irish peer
- Thomas Southwell, 4th Viscount Southwell (1836–1878), his nephew, Irish Lord Lieutenant of Leitrim
- Thomas Southwell (1813–1881), pioneer of the Australian Capital Territory, see Weetangera, Australian Capital Territory
- Thomas Southwell (zoologist) (1879–1962), British zoologist
