= High Sheriff of County Limerick =

The High Sheriff of Limerick was the British Crown's judicial representative in County Limerick, Ireland from the 13th century until 1922, when the office was abolished in the new Free State and replaced by the office of Limerick County Sheriff. The sheriff had judicial, electoral, ceremonial and administrative functions and executed High Court Writs. In 1908, an Order in Council made the Lord-Lieutenant the Sovereign's prime representative in a county and reduced the High Sheriff's precedence. However, the sheriff retained his responsibilities for the preservation of law and order in the county. The usual procedure for appointing the sheriff from 1660 onwards was that three persons were nominated at the beginning of each year from the county and the Lord Lieutenant then appointed his choice as High Sheriff for the remainder of the year. Often the other nominees were appointed as under-sheriffs. Sometimes a sheriff did not fulfil his entire term through death or other event and another sheriff was then appointed for the remainder of the year. The dates given hereunder are the dates of appointment. All addresses are in County Limerick unless stated otherwise.

== High Sheriffs of County Limerick ==
- 1274: Sir Robert Bagod the elder
- 1302-3: Sir Robert Bagod the younger
- 1355: Thomas Daundoun (also Escheator of County Limerick)
- 1371: William Cadygan
- 1372: James de la Hyde
- 1375-1376: Sir Thomas Clifford, Kt
- 1403: Thomas Fitzmaurice
- 1424–1425: Sir Thomas Fitzthomas
- 1453: Sir Thomas Fitzthomas Fitzgerot Fitzmaurice Fitzgerald
- 1545: Teige M'Brene
- 1558: Gerald Fitzgerald of Thomastown

== 17th century ==
- 1605: Randle Mainwaring
- 1613: George Courtenay
- 1634: James Bourke
- 1636: William Haly
- 1642: Richard Stevenson
- 1654: Sir Thomas Southwell, 1st Baronet
- 1661: Symon Eaton
- 1663: Richard Southwell
- 1665: Sir William King, Kt
- 1669: Arthur Ormesby
- 1671: John Maunsell
- 1672: George Evans
- 1673: Phineas Bury of Curraghbridge
- 1674: Hugh Massey
- 1675: Nicholas Munckton
- 1676: Giles Powell
- 1678–1679: John Odell
- 1680: Gerald FitzGerald, Knight of Glin
- 1682: John Jephson
- 1683–1684: William Harrison
- 1685: Sir Drury Wray, 9th Baronet
- 1686: Joseph Stepney
- 1687–1688: Edward Rice
- 1689–1690: Maurice Fitzgerald
- 1692: Charles Oliver
- 1693: George Mansell
- 1694: Michael Searle
- 1695: Ralph Wilson of Bilboa
- 1696: George King of Kilpeacon
- 1697–1698: Thomas Maunsell
- 1699: Richard Pope

== 18th century ==
- 1700: Joseph Stepney of Abingdon
- 1701: John Walcot of Croagh
- 1702: Henry Widenham of Court
- 1703: William Pierce
- 1704: Abraham Green of Ballymacrees
- 1705: Samuel Frend
- 1706: Robert Taylor of Ballynort
- 1707: Robert Southwell of Inniscouch
- 1708: Ralph Wilson of Bohir
- 1709: Edward Croker of Rawleighstown
- 1710: Robert Ryves of Castle Jane
- 1711: Hugh Massy of Duntrileague (son of Hugh, HS 1674)
- 1712: John Newell
- 1713: John Gabbett of Rathjordan
- 1714: Henry Baylee of Lough Gur
- 1715: Thomas Maunsell of Mount Sion
- 1716: Richard Taylor of Hollypark
- 1717: Samuel Maunsell of Ballybrood
- 1718: Francis Drew of Drew's Court
- 1719: William Harrison of Ballyvorneen
- 1720: Nicholas Lysaght of Brickfield
- 1721: William Wilson of Cahirconlish MP for Limerick City, 1739
- 1722: Thomas Evans of Miltown
- 1723: Rice Blennerhasset of Riddlestown
- 1724: Berkeley Taylor of Ballynort
- 1725: John Waller of Castletown
- 1726: William Bury of Shannon Grove
- 1727: Edward Taylor of Ballynort
- 1728: Gameliel Fitzgerald of Cloghready
- 1729: Connell Vereker of Roxborough
- 1730: John Purdon of Tullagh
- 1731: John Lysaght of Brickfield
- 1732: George Green of Abbey
- 1733: Ralph Wilson of Bohir
- 1734: Henry Green of Ballymacrees
- 1735: Edward Richards Croker of Rawleighstown
- 1736: Joseph Gabbett of Ballyvorneen
- 1737: Colthurst Langton of Bruree
- 1738: Anthony Parker of Dunkip
- 1739: Hugh Massy, 1st Baron Massy of Duntrileague (son of Hugh, HS 1711)
- 1740: Robert Coote of Ballyclough
- 1741: William Ryves of Castle Jane
- 1742: John FitzMaurice of Springfield
- 1743: Hon. John Evans of Bulgadin
- 1744: George Fosbery of Clorane
- 1745: John Westropp of Attyflyn
- 1746: Stephen Rawson Stepney of Abingdon
- 1747: Wyndham Quin of Adare MP for Kilmallock, 1768
- 1748: John Creed of Uregare
- 1749: John Bateman of Calow
- 1750: Hon. Henry Southwell of Stoneville
- 1751: John Odell of Bealdurogy
- 1752: Hugh Massy of Cloghonald
- 1753: Richard Powell of New Garden
- 1754: William Green of Ballymacrees
- 1755: John Prittie Croker of Ballyneguard MP for Fethard, Tipperary, 1768
- 1756: Gerald (Gerard) Blennerhassett of Riddlestown
- 1757: Edward Warter Wilson of Bilboa
- 1758: Sir Richard Bourke, 1st Baronet of Castle Connell
- 1759: Hon Thomas Southwell
- 1760: John Browne of Danesfort
- 1761: Anthony Parker, jnr of Dunkip
- 1762: John Thomas Waller of Castletown
- 1763: Thomas Royse of Nantenan
- 1764: Silver Oliver of Castle Oliver MP for Kilmallock, 1757
- 1765: Hugh Massy, 2nd Baron Massy of Duntrileague MP for Askeaton, 1776
- 1766: George Rose of Mountpleasant
- 1767: Edward Villiers of Kilpeacon MP for Kilmallock, 1761
- 1768: Richard Taylor of Holly Park
- 1769: Standish O'Grady of Elton
- 1770: Thomas Smyth of Bohirlode MP for Limerick City, 1776
- 1771: Hugh Ingoldsby Massy of Spring Garden
- 1772; Simon Purdon of Tinerana
- 1773: Caleb Powell of Clonshavoy
- 1774: John Tuthill of Kilmore
- 1775: William Gabbett of Caherline
- 1776: Benjamin Frend of Boskill
- 1777: Edward Croker of Riverstown
- 1778: William Fitzgerald of Ballinard
- 1779: William Odell of Fortwilliam
- 1780: Hugh Lloyd of Kildromin
- 1781: John O'Grady of Cahir
- 1782: John FitzGibbon, 1st Earl of Clare of Mount Shannon
- 1783: Percival Harte of Coolruss
- 1784: Sir Vere Hunt, 1st Baronet of Curragh
- 1785: Darby O'Grady of Mount Prospect
- 1786: James Langton of Bruree
- 1787: Michael Furnell of Ballyclough
- 1788: Sir Christopher Knight, Kt of Limerick
- 1789: Crosby Morgell of Rathkeale
- 1789: William Odell
- 1790: Standish O'Grady of Mount Prospect
- 1791: Charles Silver Oliver of Castle Oliver
- 1792: John Waller of Castletown
- 1793: Thomas Fitzgibbon
- 1794: John T. Westropp of Ballysteen
- 1795: Michael Furnell of Ballymacane
- 1796: Henry Bevan of Camas
- 1797: M. Scanlan, jnr of Ballinaha
- 1798: John Westropp of Attyflyn
- 1799: De Courcy O'Grady of Killballyowen

== 19th century ==
- 1800: George Evans Bruce of Castle Connell
- 1801: John Hunt of Ballynort
- 1802: William Jackson Harte of Coolruss
- 1803: Bolton Waller of Bushy Island
- 1804: Thomas Gibbon Fitzgibbon of Ballyseeda
- 1805: Thomas O'Grady of Belmont
- 1806: Joseph Gubbins of Kenmare Castle
- 1807: Stephen Dickson, jnr of Ballynaguile
- 1808: Brudenell Plummer of Mount Plummer
- 1809: Thomas Alexander Odell of Odellville
- 1810: Eyre Evans of Ash Hill
- 1811: Sir Aubrey de Vere Hunt, later Sir Aubrey de Vere, 2nd Baronet of Curragh
- 1812: Gerald (Gerard) Blennerhassett, Jnr of Riddlestown
- 1813 : William Gabbett of Caherline
- 1814: Richard Smyth of Smythfield
- 1815: William Ryves of Ryves Castle
- 1816: Thomas Royse of Nantenan
- 1817: John Lowe of Castle Jane
- 1818: Richard Taylor of Holly Park
- 1819: Michael Lloyd ApJohn of Linfield
- 1820: Edward Villiers of Kilpeacon
- 1821: Gerald de Courcy O'Grady of Kilballyowen
- 1822: John Thomas Waller of Castletown
- 1823: George Tuthill of Faha
- 1824: Joseph Gubbins of Kilfrush
- 1825: Hon. John Massey of Limerick
- 1826: John Bolton Massy of Ballyvire
- 1827: Chidley Coote of Mount Coote, Charleville
- 1828: Samuel Dickson of Limerick
- 1829: William Scanlon of Ballyknockane
- 1830: John Frauncis FitzGerald, 24th Knight of Glin
- 1831: John Croker of Ballynagarde
- 1832: Henry O'Grady of The Grange
- 1833: Thomas Lloyd of Beechmount
- 1834: George Meares Maunsell
- 1835: William Monsell, 1st Baron Emly
- 1836: Vere Edmond De Vere, later Sir Vere Edmond de Vere, 3rd Baronet of Curragh Chase
- 1837: Stephen Edmund Spring Rice of Mount Trenchard
- 1838: James Denis Lyons of Croom House
- 1839: Sir Richard Burke of Thornfield
- 1840: Richard Harte of Coolrus
- 1841: James Michael Kelly of Rockstown Castle
- 1842: Michael Furnell of Caherilly Castle
- 1843: Robert Maxwell of Islandmore
- 1844 Richard Quin Sleeman of Cabara
- 1845: Edward Cripps Villiers of Kilpeacon
- 1846: Sir Matthew Barrington, 2nd Baronet of Glenstril Castle
- 1847: Sir David Roche, 1st Baronet of Carass
- 1848: Francis W. Goold of Dromans, Limerick
- 1849: Samuel Frederick Dickson jnr of Kilkeadly
- 1850: Eyre Lloyd of Prospect Castle, Castle Connell
- 1851: Henry Maunsell of Fanstown
- 1852: John Low of Sunvale
- 1853: Hugh Massy of Riversdale
- 1854: Frederick Charles Trench Gascoigne of Castle Oliver.
- 1855: Sir Richard Donnellan Bourgho, 4th Baronet of Castle Connell.
- 1856: John White of Belmont.
- 1857: George Gavin of Kilpeacon.
- 1858: Caleb Powell of Clonshavoy.
- 1859: Heffernan Considine of Derk House.
- 1860: Henry Lyons of Croom House.
- 1861: Helenus White of Mount Sion House.
- 1862: Edward Croker of Ballynagarde.
- 1863: Joseph Gubbins of Kilfrush.
- 1864: John Franks of Ballyscadane.
- 1865: Sir David Vandeleur Roche of Carass Court.
- 1866: Henry Westropp of Greenpark.
- 1867: John White of Nantenan.
- 1868: Edward Croker of Grange.
- 1869: Edward William O'Brien of Cahermoyle.
- 1870: Stephen Edward de Vere, later Sir Stephen de Vere, 4th Baronet of Monard.
- 1871: Desmond John Edmund FitzGerald, 26th Knight of Glin.
- 1872: John Howley of Richill. (see High Sheriff of Limerick City)
- 1873: John Thomas William Massy, Bt of Duntrileague.
- 1874: William Henry Lyons of Woodville, Co. Cork
- 1875: John Bolton Massy of Ballywire.
- 1876: John Coote of Mount Coote.
- 1877: Hon Gerald N. Fitzgibbon of Mountshannon.
- 1878: Sir Charles Burton Barrington, 5th Baronet of Glenstal.
- 1879: John Joseph Roche Kelly of Rockstown Castle.
- 1880: John Christopher Delmege of Castle Park.
- 1881: Heffernan James Fritz Joseph John Considine of Derk.
- 1882: Robert de Ros Rose of Ardhu.
- 1883: Thomas John Franks of Ballyscadane.
- 1884: William Waller of Castletown.
- 1885: George Eyre Massy of Riversdale, died and replaced by Dawson Westropp of Mellon, Pallaskenry.
- 1886: John Gubbins of Bruree House, Bruree.
- 1887: Hugh Somerset Massy, 7th Baron Massy of Duntrileague.
- 1888: Thomas Richard Durbin Atkinson of Glenwilliam Castle, Ballingarry.
- 1889: Herbert Sullivan of Curramore.
- 1890: William Dickson Maunsell.
- 1891: Alex E. Bannantyne of Woodstown, Lisnagry.
- 1892: George Caulfield of Copsewood, Pallaskenry.
- 1893: James O'Grady Delmege of Castle Park.
- 1894: Thomas Francis Lloyd of Beechmount, Rathkeale.
- 1895: Hon. William Cosby Trench of Clonodfoy Castle, Kilfinane.
- 1896: Lionel Edward Massey, 5th Baron Clarina, of Elm Park.
- 1897: James Fitgerald Bannatyne J.P., D.L. of Fanningstown Castle

== 20th century ==
- 1900: Basil James Roche-Kelly of Rockstown Castle.
- 1901: William Jasper Joseph White of Mount Sion.
- 1903: Clennell Frank Massy Drew.
- 1904: Desmond FitzJohn Lloyd FitzGerald, 27th Knight of Glin.
- 1905: Hugh Hamon Massy O'Grady.
- 1906: Erasmus Joseph Beresford Gubbins of Kilrush, Knocklong.
- 1907:
- 1908: John Joseph Ryan of Scarteen, Knocklong.
- 1909:
- 1910
- 1911: James Denis Lyons of Croom House, Croom.
- 1912: John Beatty Barrington.
- 1913: Montiford Westropp Gavin.
- 1914: John de Courcy O'Grady.
- 1915: David Roche Browning.
- 1916: Dermod O'Brien.
