= George Evans (1655–1720) =

Anglo-Irish politician

George Evans PC(I) (1655 – May 1720) was an Anglo-Irish politician.

Evans was the son of George Evans of Ballyphilip and Anne Bowerman. He was a supporter of William III during the Williamite War in Ireland. In 1692, he was elected as a Member of Parliament for County Limerick in the Irish House of Commons. He subsequently represented Askeaton from 1695 to 1699, and Charleville between 1703 and 1713. He represented Charleville from 1715 until his death in 1720. In 1717, Evans was made a member of the Privy Council of Ireland.

In 1679, Evans married Mary Eyre; they had three sons and seven daughters. Their daughter Dorothy became the second wife of the accomplished lawyer, politician and judge John Forster. Evans was succeeded by his eldest son, George Evans, who had been raised to the peerage as Baron Carbery in 1715.

Parliament of Ireland
Preceded by Sir John Fitzgerald, Bt; Gerald FitzGerald, Knight of Glin	Member of Parliament for County Limerick; 1692–1693; With: Sir William King	Succeeded by Sir Thomas Southwell, Bt; Sir William King
Preceded by John Odell; Robert Taylor	Member of Parliament for Askeaton; 1695–1699; With: Robert Taylor (1695–1696); Chichester Phillips (1696–1699)	Succeeded by Robert Taylor; Chichester Phillips
Preceded by Hon. Charles Boyle; John Ormsby	Member of Parliament for Charleville; 1703–1713; With: Robert FitzGerald	Succeeded by Sir Matthew Deane, Bt; Brettridge Badham
Preceded by Sir Matthew Deane, Bt; Brettridge Badham	Member of Parliament for Charleville; 1715–1720; With: William Boyle	Succeeded by Henry Purdon; William Boyle
