= Richard Southwell (Askeaton politician) =

Irish MP

- Spouse: Elizabeth O'Brien
- Children: Thomas Southwell, 1st Baron Southwell
- Parents: Sir Thomas Southwell, 1st Baronet (father); Elizabeth Starkey (mother)

Richard Southwell (d. circa 1680) was an Irish politician.

== Birth and origins ==
Richard was the only son of Thomas Southwell and his wife Elizabeth Starkey. His father was the 1st Baronet Southwell of Castle Mattress, County Limerick. His mother was the daughter of William Starkey.

Family tree

Richard Southwell with his wife, parents, and other selected relatives. (Note: Also see the lists of children in the text.)

Edmund; Southwell	Catherine; Herbert heiress
Thomas; Southwell; 1st Baronet d. 1681	Elizabeth; Starkey d. 1705	Murrough; 1st Earl; 1614–1674	Elizabeth; St Leger; 1618–1685
Richard; Southwell d.v.p.*	Elizabeth; O'Brien d. 1688
Thomas; Southwell; 1st Baron; 1665–1720	Meliora; Coningsby	William; Southwell; 1669–1720 soldier	Richard; Southwell; 1671–1729
Thomas; 2nd Baron; 1698–1766	Mary; Coke	Henry; Southwell; 1700–1758

Legend

XXX	Subject of the article	XXX	Baronets & Barons; Southwell	XXX	Barons & earls of Inchiquin

*d.v.p. = predeceased his father (decessit vita patris)

== Political career and death ==
In 1661, Southwell was elected to the Irish House of Commons for Askeaton in County Limerick, representing the borough until 1666.

== Marriage and children ==
Southwell married Elizabeth O'Brien, daughter of Murrough O'Brien, 1st Earl of Inchiquin. They had five sons and two daughters.

== Death and succession ==
Southwell died before 1680 or 1681. Having predeceased his father, Southwell's oldest son Thomas succeeded his grandfather as baronet and was later elevated to the Peerage of Ireland as Baron Southwell. His third son William and his fifth son Richard sat both in the Parliament of Ireland.
