= Robert Taylor =

Robert Taylor may refer to:

== Arts and entertainment ==
- Robert Taylor (American actor) (1911–1969), film and television actor
- Robert Taylor (American artist) (1951–2025), painter of Native American subjects
- Robert Love Taylor (1850–1912), American politician from Tennessee
- Robert Taylor (animator) (1944–2014), American animator; directed The Nine Lives of Fritz the Cat, TaleSpin and Heidi's Song
- Robert Taylor (architect) (1714–1788), English architect and sculptor
- Robert Taylor (Australian actor) (born 1963), Agent Jones in The Matrix
- Robert Taylor (British artist) (1946–2024), painter of military and naval subjects
- Robert R. Taylor (photographer) (1940–2013), Canadian wildlife photographer
- Robert Robinson Taylor (1868–1942), first African-American architect in the US
- Robert Lewis Taylor (1912–1998), American novelist, The Travels of Jaimie McPheeters
- Bob Taylor (DJ, producer), Romanian disc jockey
- Bob Taylor (luthier), American maker of acoustic guitars; principal of Taylor Guitars
- Bobby Taylor, leader of the Canadian soul band Bobby Taylor & the Vancouvers
- Detective Bob Taylor, the "chief" investigator and semi-host of the British TV series The Murder Game

== Business and engineering ==
- Robert Taylor (mining engineer) (1855–1921), British mining engineer in India
- Robert Taylor (trade unionist) (1900–1986), Scottish trade union leader
- Robert Taylor (computer scientist) (1932–2017), American computer scientist
- Robert Richard Taylor (1932–2008), British public administrator, airport manager and Royal Air Force officer
- Robert Rochon Taylor (1897–1957), American housing activist and banker

== Literary ==
- Robert H. Taylor (1908/9–1985), American bibliophile
- Robert E. L. Taylor (1913–2009), publisher of the Philadelphia Bulletin
- Robert Saxton Taylor (1918–2009), librarian and information scientist

== Military ==
- Robert Taylor (British Army officer) (1760–1839), British general
- Robert B. Taylor (1774–1834), militia general and politician in Virginia
- Robert P. Taylor (1909–1997), American military officer and chaplain
- Bob Taylor (GC) (1920–1950), British recipient of the George Cross

== Politics and law ==
- Robert Taylor (Askeaton MP, died 1696), Irish MP for Askeaton
- Robert Taylor (Askeaton MP, died 1723) (c. 1682–1723), Irish MP for Askeaton and Tralee, son of the above
- Robert Taylor (Virginia politician) (1763–1845), American politician
- Robert Taylor (Morpeth MP) (1881–1954), British member of parliament for Morpeth, 1935–1954
- Robert Taylor (Conservative politician) (1932–1981), Conservative MP for Croydon North West, South London, 1970–1981
- Robert Arthur Taylor (1886–1934), member of parliament for Lincoln, 1924–1931
- Robert Hobbs Taylor (1893–1947), Canadian physician and politician
- Robert Love Taylor (1850–1912), American politician
- Robert Love Taylor (judge) (1899–1987), U.S. federal judge from Tennessee
- Robert Paris Taylor (c. 1741–1792), member of parliament for Berwick-upon-Tweed, 1768–1774
- Rob Taylor (politician) (born 1971), member of the Iowa House of Representatives
- Bob Taylor (Ontario politician), mayor of Brantford, 1988–1991
- R. Cowles Taylor (1893–1955), mayor of Newport News, Virginia
- Robert Taylor (MP for Rye) (died c.1428), English MP
- R. Fenwick Taylor (1849–1926), Florida chief justice
- Robert Wright Taylor (1859–1929), British solicitor

== Religion ==
- Robert Taylor (archdeacon of Lewes) (fl. 1558–1559)
- Robert Taylor (Radical) (1784–1844), English clergyman turned freethinker
- Robert Taylor (provost of Cumbrae) (1873–1944), Anglican priest and author
- Robert Selby Taylor (1909–1995), Anglican bishop
- Robert P. Taylor (1909–1997), American military officer and chaplain
- Robert V. Taylor (born 1958), first openly gay Episcopal dean in the US

== Sports ==
=== Association football ===
- Bob Taylor (footballer, born 1876) (1876–1919), English footballer
- Bob Taylor (footballer, born 1967), English footballer
- Robert Taylor (footballer, born 1971), English footballer
- Rob Taylor (footballer, born 1985), English footballer
- Robert Taylor (footballer, born 1994), Finnish footballer

=== Cricket ===
- Robert Taylor (cricketer, born 1873) (1873–?), English cricketer
- Bob Taylor (cricketer) (born 1941), English cricketer
- Robert Taylor (cricketer, born 1989), Scottish cricketer
- Robert Taylor (New Zealand cricketer) (1835–1901)

=== Gridiron football ===
- Robert Taylor (gridiron football) (1940–2006), American football player and coach
- Rob Taylor (American football) (born 1960)
- Bobby Taylor (American football) (born 1973)
- Bobby Taylor (Canadian football) (1939–2023)

=== Rugby ===
- Bob Taylor (rugby league) (c. 1892–1961), English rugby league footballer of the 1920s, and 1930s
- Robert Taylor (rugby league), rugby league footballer of the 1950s, and 1960s
- Bob Taylor (rugby union, born 1924) (1924–2015), Scottish rugby union international
- Bob Taylor (rugby union, born 1942), English rugby union international
- Robert Taylor (rugby union coach) (born 1980), Australian rugby union football coach

=== Other sports ===
- Bob Taylor (Australian footballer) (1931–2026), Australian rules footballer with Essendon
- Rob Taylor (Australian footballer) (1945–2015), Australian rules footballer for Footscray
- Bob Taylor (baseball) (born 1944), American baseball outfielder
- Bob Taylor (darts player) (born 1960), Scottish darts player
- Bob Taylor (ice hockey) (1901–1993), American professional ice hockey player
- Bobby Taylor (ice hockey) (born 1945), Canadian ice hockey player and broadcaster
- Robert Taylor (sprinter, born 1948) (1948–2007), American runner, 1972 Olympics gold medal winner in 4 × 100 m relay
- Robert Taylor (sprinter, born 1953), American runner, 1975 Pan American Games gold medal winner in 4 × 400 m relay
- Robert Taylor (bowls), Northern Irish bowls player
- Robert Taylor (basketball) (1977-2011), American Professional Player who last played for the Vaqueros de Bayamón

== Other ==
- Bob Taylor / Codename: Australia, a fictional character in the comic book series The Ambassadors and Big Game
- Robert Taylor (1919–2007), forester involved in the Robert Taylor incident, an alleged 1979 UFO sighting and attempted alien abduction in West Lothian, Scotland
- Robert L. Taylor (aviator) (1924–2020), founder and president of the Antique Airplane Association
- Robert Taylor (physician) (1710–1762), English physician

== See also ==
- Robert Walker Tayler Sr. (1812–1878), American politician
- Robert Walker Tayler (1852–1910), American congressman and federal judge, son of the above
- Robert Taylor Homes, a housing project in Chicago, Illinois
