= Bowen Southwell =

Irish politician

Bowen Southwell (23 March 1713 – 1796) was an Irish politician.

He was the third son of William Southwell and his wife Lucy Bowen, daughter of William Bowen. His uncles were Thomas Southwell, 1st Baron Southwell and Richard Southwell. Southwell entered the Irish House of Commons for Downpatrick in 1755, representing the constituency until 1760.

After the death of his brother Edward in 1736, he inherited his family's estates in Ireland. On 3 July 1753, he married Lady Elizabeth Cornwallis (1 September 1723 - 20 March 1796), oldest daughter of Charles Cornwallis, 1st Earl Cornwallis.

Parliament of Ireland
Preceded by Edward Southwell; Cromwell Price	Member of Parliament for Downpatrick; 1755–1760; With: Cromwell Price	Succeeded by Mathew Forde; Hon. Francis Annesley
