= Viscount Southwell =

Title in the peerage of Ireland

Viscountcy Southwell
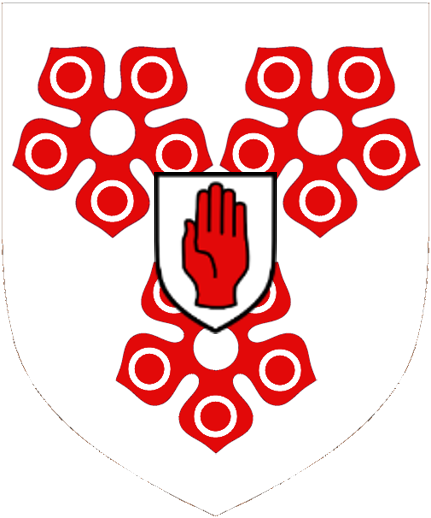
- Escutcheon: Argent three Cinquefoils pierced Gules charged on each leaf with an Annulet of the field; Crest: A Demi Indian Goat Argent armed and eared Gules ducally gorged Or and charged on the body with three Annulets in bend also Gules; Supporters: On either side an Indian Goat Argent ducally collared chained and charged on the body with three Annulets Gules
- Creation date: 18 July 1776
- Created by: George III
- Peerage: Peerage of Ireland
- First holder: Thomas, 3rd Baron Southwell
- Present holder: Richard Andrew Pyers Southwell, 8th Viscount
- Heir presumptive: The Hon. Charles Anthony John Southwell
- Remainder to: Heirs male of the first viscount's body, lawfully begotten
- Subsidiary titles: Baron Southwell; Baronet
- Former seat: Nec Male Notus Eques (Not an unknown knight)
- Motto: Deo Favente

Viscount Southwell (/ˈsʌðəl/ SUDH-əl), of Castle Mattress in the County of Limerick, is a title in the Peerage of Ireland. It was created in 1776 for Thomas Southwell, 3rd Baron Southwell. The Southwell family descends from Thomas Southwell. In 1662 he was created a Baronet, of Castle Mattress in the County of Limerick, in the Baronetage of Ireland. He was succeeded by his son, the second Baronet. He represented County Limerick in the Irish Parliament. In 1717 he was created Baron Southwell, of Castle Mattress, in the County of Limerick, in the Peerage of Ireland. His grandson was the aforementioned third Baron, who was elevated to a viscountcy in 1776. Before succeeding in the barony he had represented Enniscorthy in the Irish House of Commons. His great-grandson, the fourth Viscount, served as Lord Lieutenant of County Leitrim between 1872 and 1878. As of 2019 the titles are held by his great-great-grandson, the eighth Viscount, who succeeded his father in that year.

== Southwell Baronets, of Castle Mattress (1662) ==
- Sir Thomas Southwell, 1st Baronet (died 1680)
- Sir Thomas Southwell, 2nd Baronet (1665–1720) (created Baron Southwell in 1717)

== Barons Southwell (1717) ==
- Thomas Southwell, 1st Baron Southwell (1665–1720)
- Thomas Southwell, 2nd Baron Southwell (1698–1766)
- Thomas George Southwell, 3rd Baron Southwell (1721–1780) (created Viscount Southwell in 1776)

== Viscounts Southwell (1776) ==
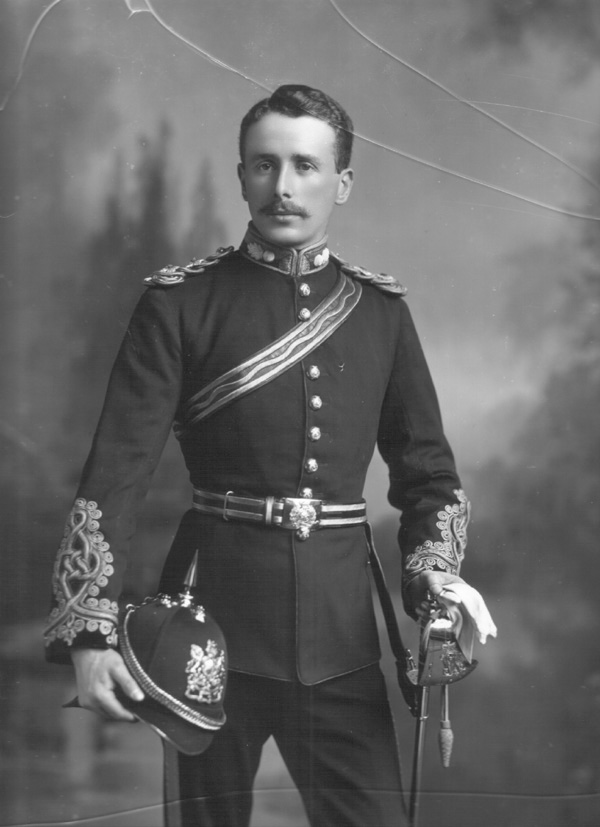
5th Viscount, by Lafayette, 1900.

- Thomas George Southwell, 1st Viscount Southwell (1721–1780)
- Thomas Arthur Southwell, 2nd Viscount Southwell (1742–1796)
- Thomas Anthony Southwell, 3rd Viscount Southwell (1777–1860)
- Thomas Arthur Joseph Southwell, 4th Viscount Southwell (1836–1878)
- Arthur Robert Pyers Southwell, 5th Viscount Southwell (1872–1944)
- Robert Arthur William Joseph Southwell, 6th Viscount Southwell (1898–1960)
- Pyers Anthony Joseph Southwell, 7th Viscount Southwell (1930–2019)
- Richard Andrew Pyers Southwell, 8th Viscount Southwell (born 1956)

The heir presumptive and last in line to the titles is the present holder's younger brother, the Hon. Charles Anthony John Southwell (born 1962).

== Ancestry ==
(ancestors of 7th Viscount)

Ancestors of Viscount Southwell

8. Thomas Southwell, 4th Viscount Southwell
4. Arthur Southwell, 5th Viscount Southwell
9. Charlotte Mostyn
2. Hon. Francis Southwell
10. William Walrond, 1st Baron Waleran
5. Hon. Dorothy Walrond
11. Elizabeth Pitman
1. Pyers Southwell, 7th Viscount Southwell
12. Sir Charles Clifford, 1st Baronet, of Flaxbourne
6. Charles Clifford
13. Marianne Hercy
3. Agnes Clifford
14. Sir Humphrey de Trafford, 2nd Baronet de Trafford
7. Sicele de Trafford
15. Lady Annette Talbot
