= David Browning (rugby union) =

Irish rugby union player

- Full name: David Roche Browning
- Born: 28 February 1856 Bruree, Limerick, Ireland
- Died: 6 February 1938 (aged 81) Bruree, Limerick, Ireland

Rugby union career
- Position: Forward
International career
Years	Team	Apps	(Points)
1881	Ireland	2	(0)

David Roche Browning (28 February 1856 – 6 February 1938) was an Irish international rugby union player.

A native of Bruree, County Limerick, Browning played his rugby in Dublin for the Wanderers club and was capped twice for Ireland in 1881, playing as a forward in matches against England at Scotland. He was later appointed the High Sheriff of County Limerick. His uncle, horse breeder John Gubbins, bequeathed him a stud farm in Knockany.

== See also ==
- List of Ireland national rugby union players
