= Thomas Southwell, 2nd Baron Southwell =

Irish peer, politician and freemason

Thomas Southwell, 2nd Baron Southwell PC (Ire), FRS (7 January 1698 – 19 November 1766), styled The Honourable from 1717 until 1720, was an Irish peer, politician and freemason.

== Background ==
He was the oldest son of Thomas Southwell, 1st Baron Southwell and his wife Lady Meliora Coningsby, eldest daughter of Thomas Coningsby, 1st Earl Coningsby. His uncles were William Southwell and Richard Southwell, his younger brother was Henry Southwell. In 1743, Southwell became Grand Master of the Grand Lodge of Ireland, a position he held until the following year.

== Career ==
In 1717, Southwell entered the Irish House of Commons for County Limerick, the same constituency his father had represented before, and sat for it until 1720, when he succeeded him also as baron. In 1726, Southwell was sworn of the Privy Council of Ireland. He became a Fellow of the Royal Society in 1735 and was Governor of County Limerick until his resignation in 1762.

== Family ==
In March 1719, he married Mary Coke, eldest daughter of Thomas Coke, and by her he had three sons. Southwell died at Craig's Court, Charing Cross, aged 68 and was succeeded in his titles by his eldest surviving son Thomas. His younger brother, Edmund Southwell, "lived in intimacy with" Samuel Johnson for many years, and was the first to introduce the great Shakespearean scholar Edmond Malone to him.

Parliament of Ireland
Preceded by Sir Thomas Southwell, 2nd Bt; Robert Oliver	Member of Parliament for County Limerick; 1717–1720; With: Robert Oliver	Succeeded by Eyre Evans; Robert Oliver
Masonic offices
Preceded by The Lord Moore of Tullamore	Grandmaster of the Grand Lodge of Ireland; 1743–1744	Succeeded by The Viscount Allen
Peerage of Ireland
Preceded by Thomas Southwell	Baron Southwell; 1720–1766	Succeeded by Thomas Southwell
