= Ballyadams =

Barony in County Laois, Ireland

Ballyadams Baile Adaim (Irish)
- Barony
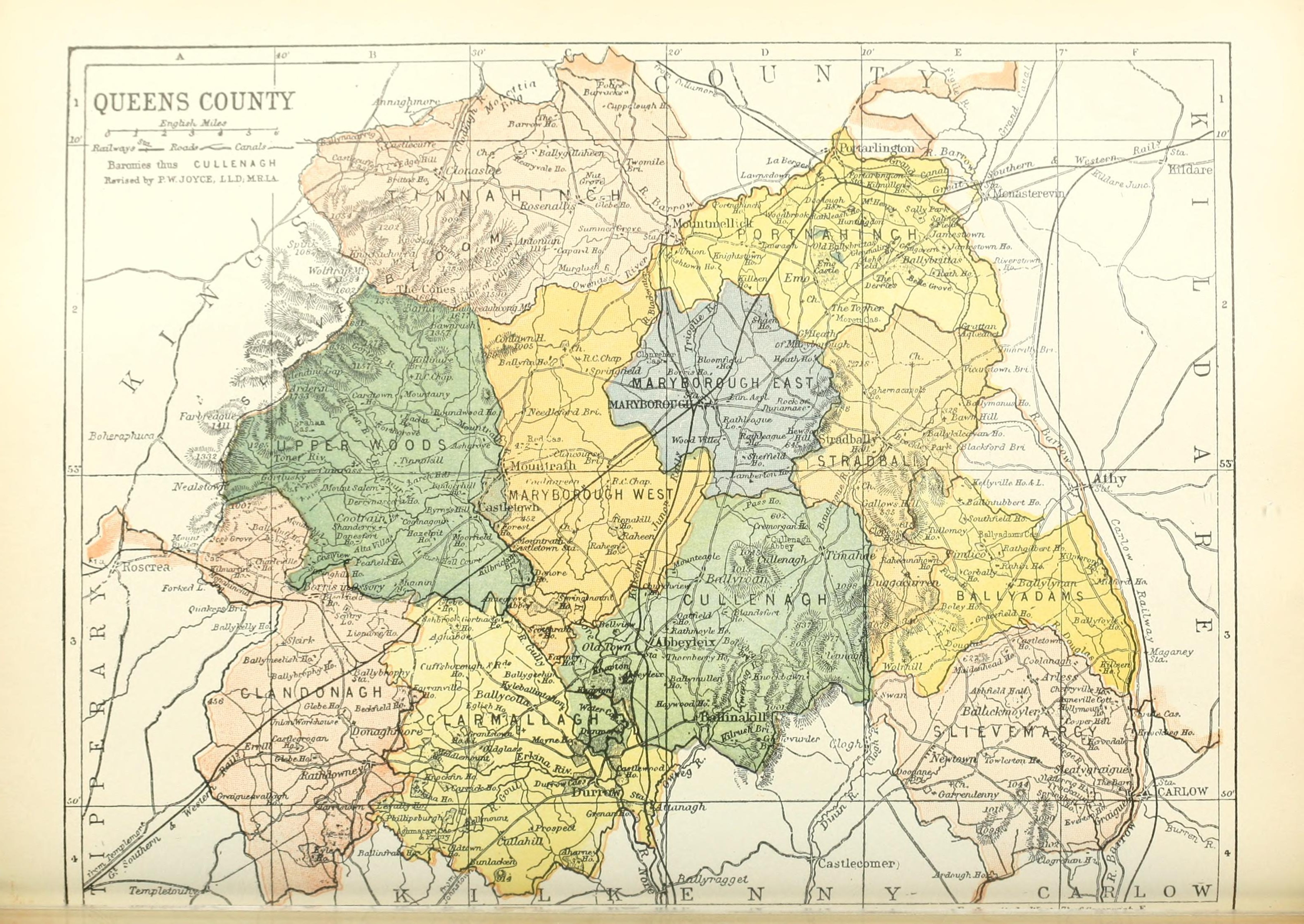
- Barony map of Queen's County, 1900; Ballyadams is orange and in the east.
- Sovereign state: Ireland
- Province: Leinster
- County: Laois

Area
  - Total: 97.45 km^{2} (37.63 sq mi)

Ballyadams (Irish: Baile Adaim) is a barony in County Laois (formerly called Queen's County or County Leix), Ireland.

== Etymology ==
Ballyadams barony is named after Ballyadams Castle, a 15th-century fortified house near Ballylynan.

== Geography ==
Ballyadams is located in the east of the county, north of the River Douglas and west of the River Barrow (where it forms part of the border with County Kildare). It is a limestone region, with some anthracite coal being mined in the past.

== History ==
Ancient chiefs in the area include the Uí Caollaidhe (Keely), who were chiefs of Críoch Uí mBuidhe.

It is referred to in the topographical poem Tuilleadh feasa ar Éirinn óigh (Giolla na Naomh Ó hUidhrín, d. 1420):

Críoch Ó mBuidhe an fhóid fhinntigh
ós Bearbha mbuig mbraoinlinntigh;
d’Ó Chaolluidhe as caomh an chríoch,
aoghoire nár fhaomh eissíoth

("Crioch O-mbuidhe of the fair sod, Along the Barrow of the bright pools, To O'Caollaidhe the territory is fair, A shepherd prepared to encounter enemies.")

The Uí Caollaidhe were expelled during the Laois-Offaly Plantation of the 16th century, and took land at Kylenabehy. Ballyadams went to the Bowen family, including Robert Bowen (High Sheriff of Queen's County 1579) and Lucy Bowen (wife of William Southwell).

== List of settlements ==
Below is a list of settlements in Ballyadams barony:

- Ballylinan
- Barrowhouse, County Laois
