= Sir Thomas Southwell, 1st Baronet =

Irish baronet (died 1681)

Thomas Southwell
- Baronet Southwell of Castle Mattress
- Tenure: 1662–1681
- Successor: Thomas Southwell, 1st Baron Southwell
- Died: May 1681
- Spouse: Elizabeth Starkey
- Issue Detail: Richard Southwell
- Father: Edmund Southwell
- Mother: Catherine Herbert

Sir Thomas Southwell, 1st Baronet, of Castle Mattress (died 7 December 1680) was a high sheriff of County Kerry under the Protectorate.

== Birth and origins ==
Thomas was probably born at Castle Matrix, near Rathkeale, the fifth but only surviving son of Edmund Southwell and his wife Catherine Herbert. His father is called "Southwell of Castle Matrix". His grandfather, John Southwell of Barham, had come to Ireland from Suffolk during the reign of James I. His mother was a rich heiress, the only child of Garrett Herbert of Rathkeale.

Family tree

Thomas Southwell with his wife, parents, and other selected relatives. (Note: Also see the lists of children in the text.)

John; Southwell of Barham	Garret; Herbert of Rathkeale
Edmund; Southwell	Catherine; Herbert heiress
John; Southwell d. 1642	Ann; Dowdall	Thomas; Southwell; 1st Baronet d. 1681	Elizabeth; Starkey d. 1705
Richard; Southwell d.v.p.* MP	Elizabeth; O'Brien d. 1688
Thomas; Southwell; 1st Baron; 1665–1720	Meliora; Coningsby	William; Southwell; 1669–1720 soldier

Legend

XXX	Subject of the article	XXX	Baronets & Barons; Southwell

*d.v.p. = predeceased his father (decessit vita patris)

Thomas listed among his brothers
He was the youngest of five brothers:
1. John (died 1642), married Anne Dowdall, daughter of Elizabeth Dowdall
2. William (died 1627), was killed at the Siege of Saint-Martin-de-Ré.
3. Ralph (died 1627), was killed on the same occasion as William
4. Edward, murdered in Holland
5. Thomas (died 1680)

Nothing seems to be known of the sisters he probably had.

== Marriage and children ==
Sir Thomas Southwell married Elizabeth Starkey, daughter of William Starkey. She would survive him and die in September 1688.

Thomas and Elizabeth had one son:

1. Richard Southwell, who married Elizabeth daughter of Murrough O'Brien, 1st Earl of Inchiquin

—and three daughters:

1. Garthruid, married John Piggot of Kilfinny as his first wife
2. Margaret, married ___ Piggott
3. Joan, married Sir William Oughtred Courtenay of Powderham in Devonshire, Baronet

== Later life and death ==
Southwell served as High Sheriff of Kerry, High Sheriff of Clare, and High Sheriff of County Limerick in 1654 under the Protectorate. On 4 August 1662 he was created 1st Baronet Southwell, of Castle Mattress in the Baronetage of Ireland, by Charles II. The castle mentioned in the territorial designation stands on the left bank of the River Deel, west of Rathkeale, and is also called Matrix or Matras.

Sir Thomas Southwell died in December 1680 or in May 1681 and was buried in Rathkeale. His eldest son, the member of parliament Richard Southwell, predeceased him and he was succeeded by his grandson Thomas, later 1st Baron, as the 2nd Baronet Southwell.

== Notes and references ==
=== Sources ===
- Burke, Bernard; Burke, Ashworth Peter (1915). A Genealogical and Heraldic History of the Peerage and Baronetage, the Privy Council, Knightage and Companionage (77th ed.). London: Harrison. OCLC 1155471554.
- Cokayne, George Edward (1903). Complete Baronetage, 1611 to 1800. Vol. III (1st ed.). Exeter: William Pollard & Co. OCLC 866278985. – 1649 to 1664
- Debrett, John (1828). Peerage of the United Kingdom of Great Britain and Ireland. Vol. II (17th ed.). London: F. C. and J. Rivington. OCLC 54499602. – Scotland and Ireland
- Kilburn, Matthew (2004). "Southwell, Thomas, first Baron Southwell". In Matthew, Colin; Harrison, Brian (eds.). Oxford Dictionary of National Biography. Vol. 51. New York: Oxford University Press. pp. 721–722. ISBN 0-19-861401-2.
- Lodge, John (1789). Archdall, Mervyn (ed.). The Peerage of Ireland or, A Genealogical History of the Present Nobility of that Kingdom. Vol. VI. Dublin: James Moore. OCLC 264906028. – Viscounts, barons
- MacCarthy-Morrogh, Michael (1983). The Munster Plantation 1583–1641 (PDF) (Ph.D.). Royal Holloway, University of London.

Baronetage of Ireland
New creation	Baronet (of Castle Mattress); 1662–1680	Succeeded by Thomas Southwell
