= George Croly =

Irish poet, novelist, historian, and divine (1780–1860)

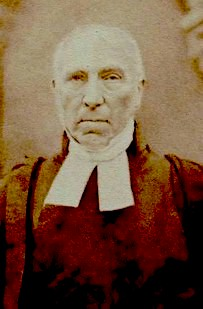
George Croly

George Croly (17 August 1780 – 24 November 1860) was an Irish poet, novelist, historian, and Anglican priest. He was rector of St Stephen Walbrook in the City of London from 1835 until his death.

== Early life ==
Croly was born in Dublin. His father was a physician. He graduated from Trinity College Dublin with an MA in 1804. The college was to award him an honorary LLD in 1831.

He was ordained in 1804, and served as a curate at a parish in the diocese of Meath until around 1810. Then, accompanied by his widowed mother, his brother Henry and his sisters, he moved to London. Finding himself unable to obtain preferment in the church, he dedicated himself to a literary career.

== Literary career ==
Croly was a leading contributor to the Literary Gazette and Blackwood's Magazine, from the establishment of both in 1817, and was also associated with the Tory magazine Britannia. He worked as a theatre critic for the New Times and later as a foreign correspondent. He wrote poems, plays, satires, novels, history, and theological works, and achieved some measure of success in all. Perhaps his best known works were his novels, Salathiel (1827), and Marston (1846). The first, based on the legend of the Wandering Jew, was published under multiple titles, including: Tarry Thou Till I Come; or, Salathiel, the Wandering Jew (1827), Salathiel, A Story of the Past, Present and the Future (1828), and Salathiel: The Immortal (1855, Routledge). His main contribution to theological literature was an exposition of the Apocalypse. His hymns included Spirit of God, descend upon my heart written in 1854.

== Religious appointments ==
In 1832 he was put in charge of the parish of Romford in Essex, while the vicar was unable to carry out his duties due to illness. The editor of the Literary Gazette, William Jerdan, had previously attempted to procure a living for him, but this had proved unsuccessful, the reason (according to Croly's obituary in the Gentleman's Magazine) being a confusion between him and another clergyman, a former Roman Catholic, with a similar name. In 1835, however, through the influence of Lord Brougham, a distant relative of his wife he was appointed rector of St Stephen Walbrook in the City of London, a position he held until his death. He had previously turned down Brougham's offer of a remote living on the edge of Dartmoor. His son Frederick wrote:

This parish being very small, and most of the parishioners non-resident, the new rector could still devote a large portion of his time to general literature. A still greater advantage of his new position was, that it afforded an opportunity of exercising in a metropolitan church those remarkable powers as a preacher, which had been comparatively thrown away upon a rural congregation. The church of St Stephen's, previously almost deserted, soon became filled, under the influence of this powerful attraction, with a large and attentive congregation, most of whom came from a considerable distance.

In 1847 he was appointed afternoon preacher to the Foundling Hospital, but soon resigned after criticism from its governors, who felt that his style was unsuitable for a congregation consisting mainly of children and servants. In his letter of resignation, Croly wrote "Christianity is a manly religion, addressed to manly understandings, and which ought to be preached in a manly language." He usually preached extemporare. S.C. Hall described him as having "'a sort of rude and indeed angry eloquence that would have stood him in better stead at the bar than in the pulpit."

== Family ==
In 1819 Croly married Margaret Helen Begbie, whom he had come to know though his work for the Literary Gazette, to which she was also a contributor. They had five sons and a daughter. His eldest son, George Alfred, a lieutenant in the 26th Bengal Native Infantry, died at the Battle of Ferozeshah in 1845, aged 23. His wife died in 1851, and he lost his nine-year-old daughter a few months later.

== Death ==
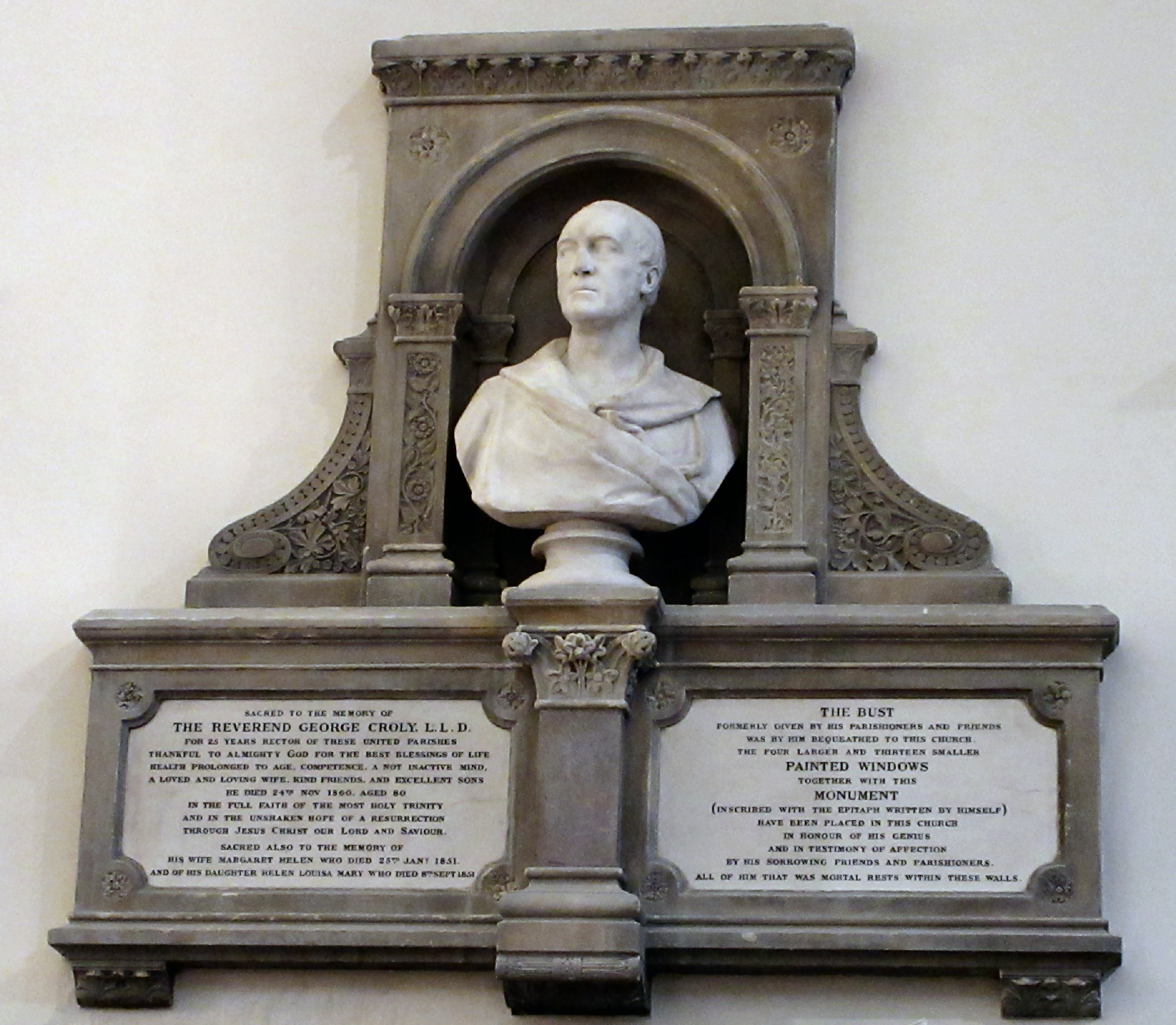
Memorial

He died suddenly on 24 November 1860 while walking near his home in Bloomsbury, and was buried in St Stephen's.

== Writings ==
His published works included:

- Paris in 1815, a poem, 1817.
- The Angel of the World, 1820.
- May Fair, 1820.
- Catiline, a tragedy, 1822.
- Tales of the Saint Bernard
- The Apocalypse of St. John (1827).
- The Beauties of the British Poets, With a Few Introductory Observations, 1828. Historicist interpretation.
- Salathiel, a novel, 1828.
- Anonymous [George Croly], "Colonna, the Painter," Blackwood's Edinburgh Magazine, vol. XXVI, no. CLVI (September, 1829), pp. 351–385.
- Divine Providence, or the Three Cycles of Revelation, Showing the Parallelism of the Patriarchal, Jewish, and Christian Dispensations : Being a New Evidence of the Divine Origin of Christianity, 1834.
- Life and times of George IV (1830). This is described by Richard Garnett in the Dictionary of National Biography as "a work of no historical value, but creditable to his independence of spirit."
- A Sketch of the Life and Times of Bishop Taylor (1838). Preface to The Rule and Exercises of Holy Living, Jeremy Taylor, D.D., 1860, Philadelphia: J.W. Bradley
- Marston, a novel, 1846,
- The Modern Orlando, a poem, 1846.
- The Holy Land, Syria, Idumea, Arabia, Egypt, and Nubia, 1855
- The Book of Job, published posthumously in 1863.

His collected poems were published in 1830.
