= Berkeley Taylor =

Irish politician (died 1735)

Berkeley Taylor (before 1683 – 25 June 1735) was an Irish Member of Parliament.

== Biography ==
The son of Robert Taylor of Ballynort, he entered the Irish House of Commons as member for Askeaton at a by-election in 1723, and sat for the borough until his death. His father, brother Robert, and sons William and Edward were also MPs for Askeaton. Besides his estate at Ballynort in County Limerick, he also owned several properties in County Cork. He was High Sheriff of County Limerick in 1724 and a founder member of the Dublin Society in 1731.
