= Elizabeth Jekyll =

English diarist (1624–1653)

- Born: Elizabeth Ward; 1624 prob. London, UK
- Died: 1653 (aged 28–29) prob. London, UK
- Known for: her diary
- Spouse: John Jekyll
- Children: five

Elizabeth Jekyll born Elizabeth Ward (1624 – 1653) was an English diarist. She was married to John Jekyll who was a leading parliamentarian. Her diary is an insight into her life during the English Civil War.

== Life ==
Jekyll was probably born in London, as she was baptised on 18 July 1624 at St Christopher's church which was in the parish of St Mary Woolchurch in London. Her parents were George and Elizabeth Ward who were well connected. She married John Jekyll who was the son of Thomas Jekyll sometime before 1643. Her husband was a leading parliamentarian, a freeman and a haberdasher. She came to notice because she started a diary when she married. Her diary records the births of seven children (five survived) and her husband's efforts on behalf of the parliamentarians. Her husband was arrested in Bristol as the "leading roundhead" and later released. Jekyll records her meditations on his arrest including her explanation that this was caused by her own sins. She records the progress of the civil war and family events. Besides the meditations, the diary also includes some poetry and an account of the trial of the martyr or traitor Christopher Love.

== Death and legacy ==
Jekyll died a week after the birth of her seventh child, and she was buried in St Stephen Walbrook. Her husband married again and had five more children, but he chose to be buried next to his first wife and he left his money to his second wife and Thomas Jekyll, who was his and Elizabeth's eldest child. Her diary survived her, and at some point it was copied by someone unknown. This was after 1685 because other quotes are from a later date. The diary is now in the Beinecke Rare Book & Manuscript Library at Yale University.
