= Gerald FitzGerald, Knight of Glin =

Irish soldier and politician (died 1689)

Gerald FitzGerald, 17th Knight of Glin (died 1689) was an Irish Jacobite soldier and politician, the son of John FitzGerald, 16th Knight of Glin and Honora O'Connor.

Between 1661 and 1666, FitzGerald was the Member of Parliament for Limerick City in the Irish House of Commons. In 1680, he was appointed High Sheriff of County Limerick. FitzGerald was a supporter of James II following the Glorious Revolution, and in 1689 he represented County Limerick in the brief Patriot Parliament in Dublin. He also fought as an officer in James' Irish army and was killed in the Battle of Windmill Hill following the Siege of Derry in 1689.

He had married Joan O'Brien, daughter of Donough O'Brien, and was succeeded as knight by his son, Thomas FitzGerald.

Parliament of Ireland
Preceded by Sir William King; Robert Oliver	Member of Parliament for County Limerick; 1689; With: Sir John Fitzgerald, Bt	Succeeded by George Evans; Sir William King
Preceded by George Ingoldsby; Standish Hartstonge	Member of Parliament for Limerick City; 1661–1666; With: Sir Standish Hartstonge, Bt	Succeeded by Nicholas Arthur; Thomas Harold
