= Henry Rose (Irish politician) =

Henry Rose (1675-1743) was an Irish politician and judge of the eighteenth century.

He was born at Morgans in County Limerick, younger son of George Rose of Morgans North, and grandson of Thomas Rose, who was Mayor of Limerick in 1695. Thomas had emigrated to Ireland from Devon in the late seventeenth century and acquired the Morgans estate. Henry was educated at Magdalen Hall, Oxford, entered the Inner Temple in 1696 and was called to the Irish Bar in 1701.

He sat in the Irish House of Commons for many years as member for Ardfert. He was considered one of the most effective Parliamentarians of his day, and almost always spoke and voted against the Government. Given his record of opposition, his appointment as a justice of the Court of King's Bench (Ireland) in 1734 caused some surprise, although he had been counsel to the Revenue Commissioners since 1722. He probably owed the first appointment to his friendship with William Conolly, the long-serving Speaker of the Commons. He went regularly on assize in Munster, except in the famine year 1741, when a rampant fever made the journey too dangerous, and three of the few judges who braved the perils of the journey succumbed to a fatal illness. He died suddenly in 1743. In addition to his estate at Morgans he had a Dublin townhouse on Dominick Street.

He married Anne Crosbie, daughter of David Crosbie of County Kerry and Jane Hamilton, and sister of Maurice Crosbie, 1st Baron Brandon. She died in 1740. They had two children, George, who inherited Morgans, and Sarah. Sarah married as her first husband her cousin John Southwell of Enniscourt, County Limerick, only son of Richard Southwell MP and Agnes Rose, daughter of Henry's brother George, and had a daughter Agnes Elizabeth, who married John Wandesford, 1st Earl Wandesford. After Southwell's death, Sarah remarried into the Talbot family of Mount Talbot, County Roscommon.

== Sources ==
- Ball, F. Elrington The Judges in Ireland 1221-1921 London John Murray 1926
- Burke, Sir Bernard The Landed Gentry of Ireland London 1912
- Smyth, Joseph Constantine Chronicle of the Law Officers of Ireland London 1839
