= Sir John Fitzgerald, 2nd Baronet =

Irish Jacobite politician and soldier

Sir John Fitzgerald, 2nd Baronet (c.1640 – 7 May 1712) was an Irish Jacobite politician and soldier.

== Biography ==
Fitzgerald was the son of Sir Edmond Fitzgerald, 1st Baronet and Mary Fitzgerald. He was educated in Nantes, France and was there when he inherited his father's baronetcy in c.1665. In 1670 he received 3,000 acres of land from Charles II of England; a restoration of estates that had been seized from his father during the Cromwellian Conquest of Ireland.

A Roman Catholic, Fitzgerald was accused of involvement in the Popish Plot in 1681 and was summoned to London. He spent a period in prison before a grand jury at Westminster threw out the charge.

He began his military career in 1685 when he was granted a commission by James II of England. He was the colonel of his own regiment by 1689. Fitzgerald supported James II following the Glorious Revolution. He was present at the Siege of Derry in 1689, where his brother Captain Maurice Fitzgerald was killed. Fitzgerald was the Member of Parliament for County Limerick in the Patriot Parliament summoned by James. In September 1689 troops under Fitzgerald's command occupied Trinity College Dublin and seized the Great Book of Lecan.

Fitzgerald was present at the Siege of Limerick (1691). In 1691, he was attainted and lost both his title and estate, leaving for France in November 1691 in the Flight of the Wild Geese. He commanded the Régiment de Limerick of the Irish Brigade in French service and fought at the Battle of Landen in 1693. He also fought for France in Italy in 1696 and on the Rhine in 1697.

In 1674, he wed Ellen, who was likely Maurice Fitzgerald's daughter. It is unknown if they had children while she was still alive in 1703.

Parliament of Ireland
Preceded by Sir William King; Robert Oliver	Member of Parliament for County Limerick; 1689; With: Gerald Fitzgerald	Succeeded by George Evans; Sir William King
Baronetage of England
Preceded by Edmond Fitzgerald	Baronet (of Clenlish) c.1665–1691	Forfeit
