= Thomas Southwell, 1st Viscount Southwell =

British Army officer and politician (1721–1780)

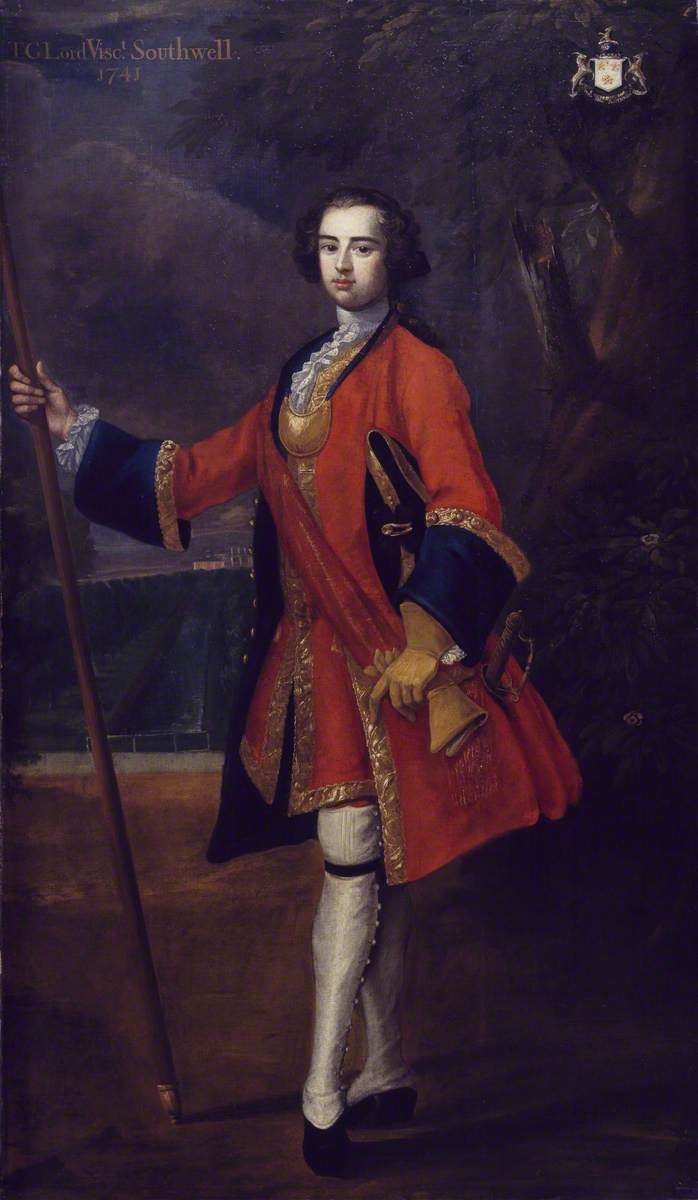
1739 portrait of Southwell by Charles Jervas

Thomas George Southwell, 1st Viscount Southwell (4 May 1721 – 29 August 1780) was a British Army officer and politician who served as the governor of Limerick from 1762 to 1780.

== Background ==
He was the oldest son of Thomas Southwell, 2nd Baron Southwell and his wife Mary Coke, eldest daughter of Thomas Coke. Southwell was educated at Lincoln's Inn and went then to Christ Church, Oxford. He was commissioned an ensign in the 2nd Regiment of Foot Guards on 1 May 1738, retiring from the Army in November 1741. Between 1753 and 1757, Southwell was Grandmaster of the Grand Lodge of Ireland.

== Career ==
In 1747, Southwell entered the Irish House of Commons for Enniscorthy, sitting for it until 1761. Subsequently, he was returned for County Limerick, the same constituency his father and his uncle Henry Southwell had represented before, until 1766, when he succeeded his father as baron. Three years later, Southwell delivered his maiden speech in the Irish House of Lords. He was appointed Constable of Limerick Castle in 1750 and Governor of County Limerick in 1762, posts he held until his death in 1780. He was made High Sheriff of County Limerick for 1759. In 1776, Southwell was elevated to the title Viscount Southwell, of Castle Mattress, in the County of Limerick.

== Family ==
On 18 June 1741, he married Margaret Hamilton, daughter of Arthur Cecil Hamilton of Castle Hamilton, Killeshandra, Co. Cavan and had by her three sons, Thomas (died young), Thomas Southwell, 2nd Viscount Southwell, and Robert, and a daughter, Lucia.

Southwell had another daughter, Meliora, named after her paternal great-grandmother. The identity of this daughter's mother is not clear. Southwell recognised her as his daughter and, being her natural father, he was granted guardianship of her by the Court of Chancery of Great Britain. On 19 December 1758, Meliora married, by licence from the Archbishop of Canterbury, Joseph Otway, at St James's Church, Piccadilly. As a minor, Southwell had to give his permission for the marriage to proceed. The marriage was witnessed by Southwell, his son, Thomas, and his daughter Lucia.

Southwell died, aged 59 and was buried at Rathkeale. He was succeeded in his titles by his eldest surviving son, Thomas, while his younger son, Robert, also sat in the Parliament of Ireland.

Parliament of Ireland
Preceded by Anderson Saunders; Richard Le Hunt	Member of Parliament for Enniscorthy; 1747–1761; With: Anderson Saunders	Succeeded by Beauchamp Bagenal; John Grogan
Preceded by Eyre Evans; Hugh Massy	Member of Parliament for County Limerick; 1761–1766; With: Hugh Massy	Succeeded by Hon. Thomas Arthur Southwell; Hugh Massy
Masonic offices
Preceded by Lord George Sackville	Grandmaster of the Grand Lodge of Ireland; 1753–1757	Succeeded by Brinsley Butler, Lord Newtown-Butler
Peerage of Ireland
New creation	Viscount Southwell; 1776–1780	Succeeded by Thomas Southwell
Preceded by Thomas Southwell	Baron Southwell; 1766–1780	Succeeded by Thomas Southwell
