= Hugh Massy, 1st Baron Massy =

Anglo-Irish peer and politician

Hugh Massy, 1st Baron Massy (1700 – 30 January 1788) was an Anglo-Irish peer and politician.

Massy was the son of Colonel Hugh Massy and the elder brother of General Eyre Massey, 1st Baron Clarina. He married firstly Mary Dawson, daughter of Colonel James Dawson by who he had four children. He married secondly Rebecca Delap, daughter of Francis Delap of Antigua, and had a further seven children.

He was appointed High Sheriff of County Limerick for 1739 and was a Member of the Irish House of Commons for County Limerick between 1759 and 1776. Subsequently, he represented Old Leighlin until 1777.

In 1776 he was raised to the Peerage of Ireland as Baron Massy, of Duntrileague in the County of Limerick. Lord Massy died in January 1788 and was succeeded in the barony by his son Hugh.

Parliament of Ireland
Preceded by Eyre Evans; Hon. Henry Southwell	Member of Parliament for County Limerick; 1759–1776; With: Eyre Evans 1759–1761; Hon. Thomas George Southwell 1761–1767; Hon. Thomas Arthur Southwell 1767–1768; Silver Oliver 1768–1776	Succeeded by Silver Oliver; Sir Henry Hartstonge, 3rd Bt
Preceded by Sir FitzGerald Aylmer, 6th Bt; Sir John Blaquiere	Member of Parliament for Old Leighlin; 1776–1777; With: Sir John Blaquiere	Succeeded by Robert Jephson; Sir John Blaquiere
Peerage of Ireland
New creation	Baron Massy; 1776–1788	Succeeded by Hugh Massy
