= Lord Lieutenant of Leitrim =

Ceremonial officer in Leitrim, Ireland

The following is a list of those who have been Lord Lieutenant of Leitrim.

There were lieutenants of counties in Ireland until the reign of James II, when they were renamed governors. The office of Lord Lieutenant was recreated on 23 August 1831.

Leitrim became part of the Irish Free State upon its founding in 1922 after the war of independence.

== Governors ==
- Nathaniel Clements: 1758–1777
- Robert Clements, 1st Earl of Leitrim: 1777–1804
- Walter Jones: 1805–1831
- Henry John Clements: 1808–1831
- Luke White: 1817–1824

== Lord Lieutenants ==
- Nathaniel Clements, 2nd Earl of Leitrim: 7 October 1831 – 31 December 1854
- Edward King Tenison: 31 January 1855 – December 1856
- George Forbes, 7th Earl of Granard: 4 December 1856 – September 1872
- Thomas Southwell, 4th Viscount Southwell: 10 September 1872 – 26 April 1878
- William Ormsby-Gore, 2nd Baron Harlech: 27 June 1878 – 25 June 1904
- George Ormsby-Gore, 3rd Baron Harlech: 19 August 1904 – 1922
