= Askeaton (Parliament of Ireland constituency) =

Pre-1801 Irish constituency

- Former borough constituency for the Irish House of Commons
- County: County Limerick
- Borough: Askeaton

1614–1801
- Replaced by: Disfranchised

Askeaton was a constituency represented in the Irish House of Commons until 1800.

== History ==
In the Patriot Parliament of 1689 summoned by King James II, Askeaton was represented with two members.

== Members of Parliament, 1614–1801 ==
Election	First MP	Second MP
1613	Roger Rice	Anthony Stoughton
1634	Maurice Williams	Sir Hardress Waller
1639	George Crofton	Maurice Williams (resigned and replaced by William Dobbins)
1661	Sir Anthony Morgan	Richard Southwell
1689	John Bourke	Edward Rice
1692	John Odell	Robert Taylor
1695	George Evans	Robert Taylor
1696	George Evans	Chichester Phillips
1703	Robert Taylor	Chichester Phillips
1713	Robert Taylor	Philip Perceval
1715	John Bury	Edward Denny
1723	Berkeley Taylor	Edward Denny
1727	Berkeley Taylor	Edward Taylor
1737	William Taylor	Edward Taylor
1747	John Minchin-Walcott	Edward Taylor
1753	Edmond Malone	Edward Taylor
1761	Joseph Hoare (Note: Created a baronet in 1784)	James Cotter (Note: Created a baronet in 1763)
1768	Joseph Hoare	John Tunnadine
1776	Joseph Hoare	Hon. Hugh Massy
1783	Joseph Hoare	Richard Griffith
1790	Joseph Hoare	Henry Alexander
January 1798	Joseph Hoare	John Stewart (Note: Also elected for Bangor in 1798, for which he chose to sit)
1798	Joseph Hoare	Sir Vere Hunt, 1st Baronet
1801	Disenfranchised	

== Bibliography ==
- O'Hart, John (2007). The Irish and Anglo-Irish Landed Gentry: When Cromwell came to Ireland. Vol. II. Heritage Books. ISBN 0-7884-1927-7.
- Leigh Rayment's historical List of Members of the Irish House of Commons. Cites: Johnston-Liik, Edith Mary (2002). The History of the Irish Parliament 1692-1800 (6 volumes). Ulster Historical Foundation.
