= Thomas Southwell, 4th Viscount Southwell =

Irish peer

The Right Honourable The Viscount Southwell KP
- Born: Thomas Arthur Joseph Southwell; 6 April 1836
- Died: 26 April 1878 (aged 42)
- Offices: Lord Lieutenant of Leitrim
- Spouses: Charlotte née Mostyn (1871-1878, his death)
- Issue: 2
- Parents: Lt.-Col. Hon. Arthur Francis Southwell; Mary Anne Agnes Dillon

Thomas Arthur Joseph Southwell, 4th Viscount Southwell KP (6 April 1836 – 26 April 1878) was an Irish peer. He was the son of Lieutenant-Colonel Arthur Francis Southwell and Mary Anne Agnes Dillon. He joined the Army, but resigned after only three years. He became Viscount Southwell in 1860 on the death of his uncle Thomas Southwell, 3rd Viscount Southwell, whose heir apparent died without issue, and was appointed a Knight of the Order of St Patrick on 2 August 1871.

Lord Southwell married Charlotte Mary Barbara Mostyn, daughter of Sir Pyers Mostyn, 8th Bt. and the Hon. Frances Georgiana Fraser (youngest daughter of Thomas Fraser, 12th Lord Lovat). They had a son, who became the 5th Viscount, and a daughter, Frances, who married Major Herbert Stourton, a grandson of Charles Stourton, 19th Baron Stourton.

Honorary titles
Preceded by The Earl of Granard	Lord Lieutenant of Leitrim; 1871–1878	Succeeded by The Lord Harlech
Peerage of Ireland
Preceded by Thomas Southwell	Viscount Southwell; 1860–1878	Succeeded by Arthur Southwell
