= Thomas Southwell, 2nd Viscount Southwell =

18th-century Irish peer and politician

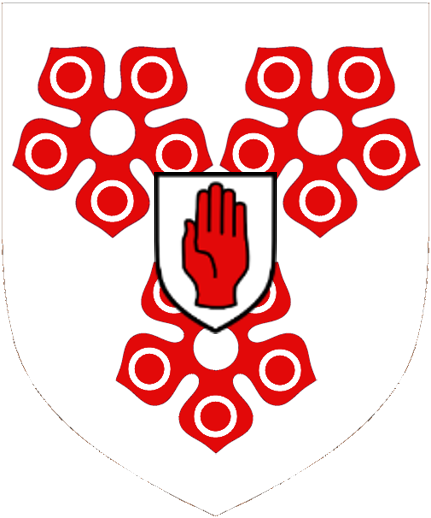
Shield of arms of the Viscount Southwell

Thomas Arthur Southwell, 2nd Viscount Southwell (16 April 1742 – 14 February 1796), styled The Honourable from 1766 until 1780, was an Irish peer and politician.

He was the oldest son of Thomas Southwell, 1st Viscount Southwell and his wife Margaret Hamilton, daughter of Arthur Cecil Hamilton of Castle Hamilton, Killeshandra Co. Cavan. His younger brother was Robert Henry Southwell. Southwell was educated at Trinity College Dublin. In 1780, he succeeded his father as viscount.

In 1767, Southwell entered the Irish House of Commons for County Limerick, the same constituency his father had represented before, and sat for it until the following year.

== Marriage, children, and succession ==
On 7 November 1774, he married Sophia Maria Josepha Walsh, third daughter of Francis Joseph Walsh, Comte de Serrant, and had by her four sons and four daughters. Southwell died aged 53 and was succeeded in his titles by his oldest son Thomas.

Parliament of Ireland
Preceded by Hon. Thomas George Southwell; Hugh Massy	Member of Parliament for County Limerick; 1767–1768; With: Hugh Massy	Succeeded by Silver Oliver; Hugh Massy
Peerage of Ireland
Preceded by Thomas Southwell	Viscount Southwell; 1780–1796	Succeeded by Thomas Southwell
