= Robert Taylor (Askeaton MP, died 1696) =

Irish politician (died 1696)

Robert Taylor (before 1660 – March 1696) was an Irish Member of Parliament.

== Biography ==
He sat in the Irish House of Commons for Askeaton in the parliaments of 1692 and 1695. On his death he was succeeded by Chichester Phillips. His sons Berkeley and Robert also sat for the borough.
