= Bilboa =

Village in County Laois, Ireland

Coordinates: 52.798°N 7.040°W

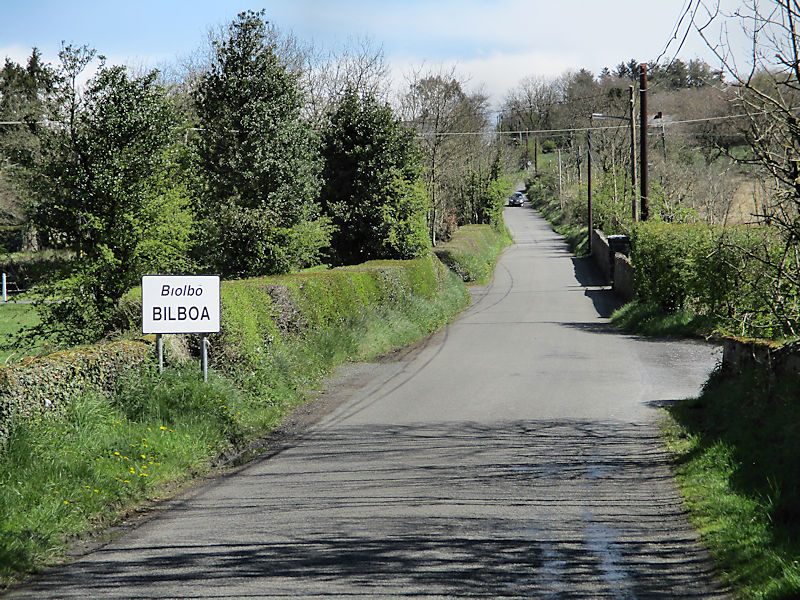
Road sign on approach to Bilboa

Bilboa (Irish: Biolbó) is a settlement located on the boundaries of counties Carlow, Laois and Kilkenny in Ireland. A bridge, a short distance from the village and built c. 1800, is known as the 'Three Counties Bridge'.

The little settlement at Bilboa was originally based around coal and coal mining. Of the original mining village, only the church remains. Bilboá's Church of Ireland church is a detached three-bay Tudor Revival church, built in 1846. It has a crenellated entrance tower and granite dressings, including clasping buttresses on octagonal plans. The interior retains its original pews.

Some sources link the origin of the name Bilboa to Colonel John Staunton Rochford (1802-1844), who is credited with an act of valour while stationed with the British Army near the Spanish city of Bilboa. He became known as Rochford of Bilboa, whereas his family before him were the Rochfords of Clogrennene. Later members of his family were involved in the building of Bilboa church c. 1850.

The area is home to a windfarm, a national (primary) school and an An Post post office.
