= Thomas Southwell, 1st Baron Southwell =

Irish peer and politician (1665–1720)

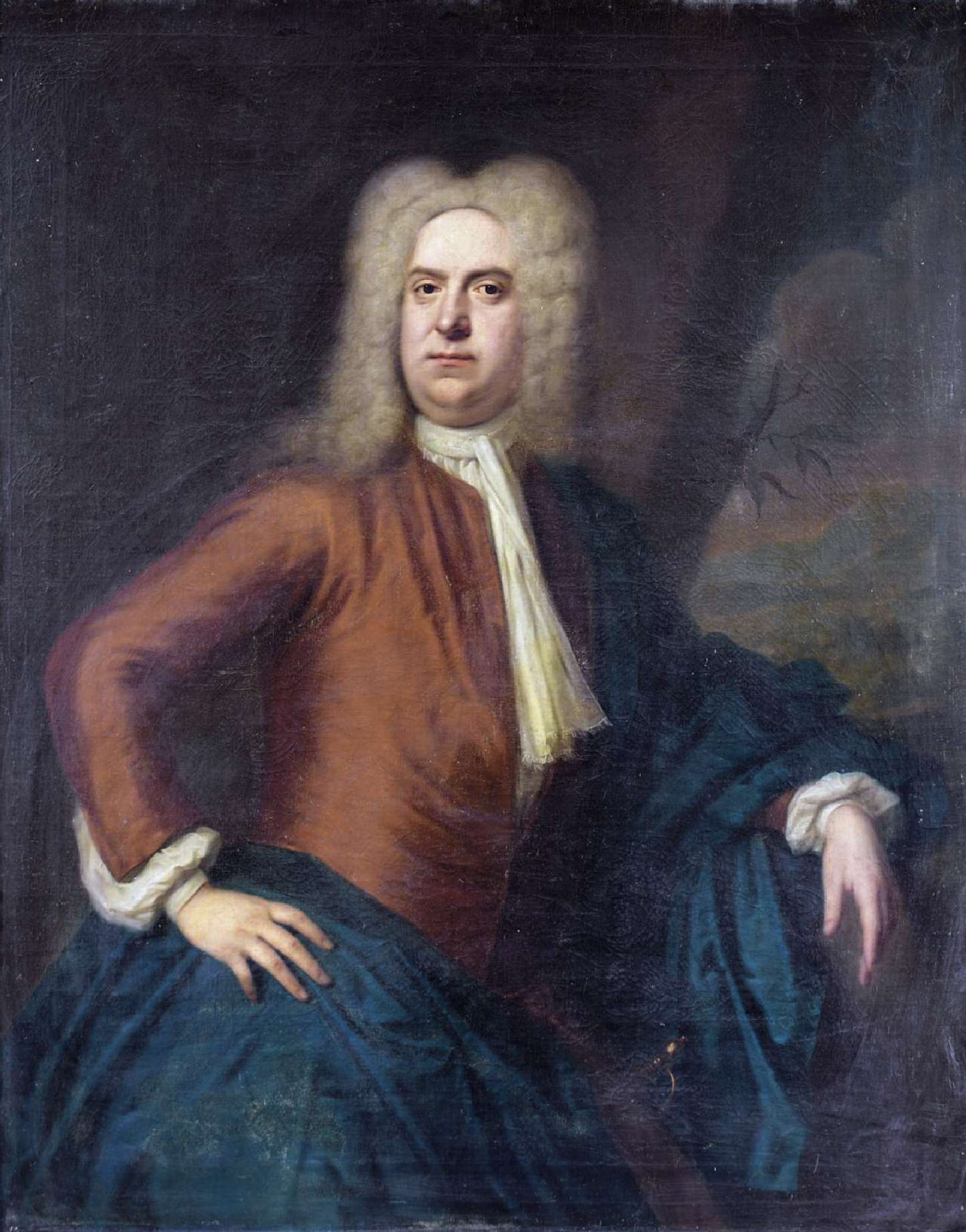
Thomas, 1st Baron Southwell of Castle Mattress (Balthasar Denner)

Thomas Southwell, 1st Baron Southwell PC (Ire) (1665 – 4 August 1720), known as Sir Thomas Southwell, 2nd Baronet from 1681 to 1717, was an Irish peer and politician.

== Background ==
He was the oldest son of Richard Southwell, son of Sir Thomas Southwell, 1st Baronet, and his wife Lady Elizabeth O'Brien, daughter of Murrough O'Brien, 1st Earl of Inchiquin. His younger brothers were William Southwell and Richard Southwell. In 1681, his father having predeceased him, Southwell succeeded his grandfather as baronet. During the Glorious Revolution of 1689, after he led an unsuccessful rising in County Galway, he and his brother were attainted by the parliament of King James II of England. Southwell was also imprisoned, but was released and pardoned the following year.

== Career ==
In 1695, Southwell entered the Irish House of Commons for County Limerick, representing it until 1713. He was returned for the constituency again from 1715 until August 1717, when he was elevated to the Peerage of Ireland as Baron Southwell, of Castle Mattress, in the County of Limerick. In 1697, Southwell became a Commissioner of the Revenue, however resigned in 1712. He was reappointed two years later and held this post until his death in 1720. In May 1710, Southwell was sworn of the Privy Council of Ireland.

== Family ==
In April 1696, he married Lady Meliora Coningsby, eldest daughter of Thomas Coningsby, 1st Earl Coningsby and his first wife Barbara Gorges. They had six sons and five daughters. Southwell died at Dublin and was buried at Rathkeale. He was succeeded in his titles by his oldest son Thomas. His second son Henry also sat in the Parliament of Ireland.

Parliament of Ireland
| Preceded by George Evans; Sir William King | Member of Parliament for County Limerick; 1695–1713; With: Sir William King 1695–1703; Charles Oliver 1703–1707; George Evans 1707–1713 | Succeeded by George King; George Evans |
| Preceded by George King; George Evans | Member of Parliament for County Limerick; 1715–1717; With: Robert Oliver | Succeeded by Hon. Thomas Southwell; Robert Oliver |
Peerage of Ireland
| New creation | Baron Southwell; 1717–1720 | Succeeded by Thomas Southwell |
Baronetage of Ireland
| Preceded by Thomas Southwell | Baronet (of Castle Mattress); 1681–1720 | Succeeded by Thomas Southwell |
