= John Gubbins =

John Russell Gubbins (16 December 1838 – 20 March 1906) was an Irish racehorse owner and breeder.

== Life ==
Gubbins was born in 1838 at the family home, Kilfrush in County Limerick, the fourth son of Joseph Gubbins and his wife Maria, daughter of Thomas Wise of Cork.

Of three surviving brothers and five sisters, the third brother, Stamer, was a captain in the Crimean war, and afterwards bred horses at Knockany, where he died in 1879 aged forty-six, owing to the fall upon him of a horse which he had been "schooling" over fences.

John Gubbins was privately educated; he inherited the Knockany property from his brother Stamer, and purchased the estate of Bruree, County Limerick. A fortune was also left him by an uncle, Francis Wise of Cork. Settling at Bruree in 1868, he spent about £40,000 in building kennels and stables, and buying horses and hounds. He hunted the Limerick country with both stag and fox hounds, and was an angler, until forced to stop by the operations of the Land League in 1882.

=== Horseracing career ===
From youth he took a keen interest in horseracing. At first his attention was mainly confined to steeplechasers, and he rode many winners at Punchestown and elsewhere in Ireland. He was the owner of Seaman when that horse won the grand hurdle race at Auteuil, but had sold him to Lord Manners before he won the 1882 Grand National at Liverpool.

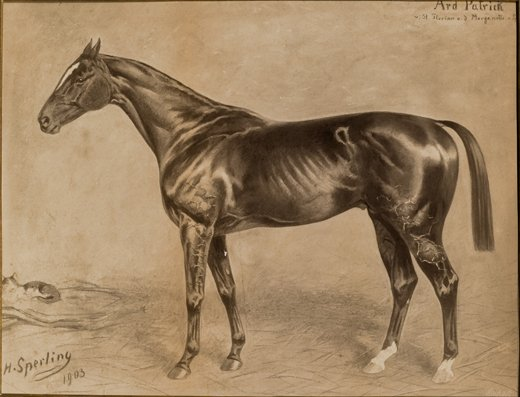
Monochrome lithograph of Ard Patrick

Buying the stallions Kendal and St Florian, he bred, from the mare Morganette, Galtee More by the former and Ard Patrick by the latter. Galtee More won the 2000 Guineas Stakes and the St Leger Stakes as well as the Epsom Derby in 1897, and was afterwards sold to the Russian government for £21,000, who later passed him on to the Prussian government for £14,000. The latter government also bought Ard Patrick for £21,000 a day or two before he won the Eclipse Stakes of £10,000 in 1903, when he defeated Sceptre and Rock Sand after an exceptionally exciting contest. Other notable horses bred by Gubbins were Blairfinde (winner of the Irish Derby) and Revenue. In 1897 he headed the list of winning owners with a total of £22,739, and was third in the list in 1903.

Gubbins was afterwards rarely seen on a racecourse owing to failing health, and in 1903 he sold his horses in training. In 1905, however, his health having apparently improved, he sent some yearlings to Cranborne, Dorset, to be trained by Sir Charles Nugent, but before these horses could run he died at Bruree on 20 March 1906. He was buried in the private burial ground at Kilfrush.

He was High Sheriff of County Limerick in 1886, as well as a justice of the peace and deputy lieutenant. His biographer in Dictionary of National Biography (1912) wrote: "A warm-hearted, genial personality, he was a kind and indulgent landlord and employer, and a sportsman of the best type."

== Family ==
He married in 1889 Edith, daughter of Charles Legh of Adlington Hall, Cheshire; she predeceased him without issue. His estates passed to his nephew, John Norris Browning, a retired naval surgeon.
