= Thomas Southwell (priest) =

English priest (fl. 1420s – 1440s)

Thomas Southwell (fl. 1420s – 1440s) was a Canon of Windsor from 1428 to 1431.

== Career ==
He was appointed:

- Vicar of Ruislip 1437–1440
- Rector of St Stephen's, Walbrook 1428–1440
- Prebendary of the 10th stall in St Stephen's Westminster 1431–1441

He was appointed to the eighth stall in St George's Chapel, Windsor Castle in 1428 and held the canonry until 1431.
