= Charles Oliver (died 1706) =

Irish landowner (1646–1706)

Charles Oliver (1646 – 13 April 1706) was an Irish landowner.

The son of Captain Robert Oliver (died 1679) ("Robin Rhu") of Castle Oliver, Oliver was Sheriff of County Limerick in 1692, Sheriff of County Cork in 1695, Member of Parliament for Midleton from 1695 to 1699, Deputy Governor of County Limerick in 1699 and Member of Parliament for County Limerick from 1703 until his death.

He was married to Elizabeth, daughter of Sir Percy Smyth of County Waterford. They had a son, Robert Oliver (died 1739), and four daughters, who married into Cork and Limerick families.
