= Rockstown Castle =

Ruined tower house in County Limerick, Ireland

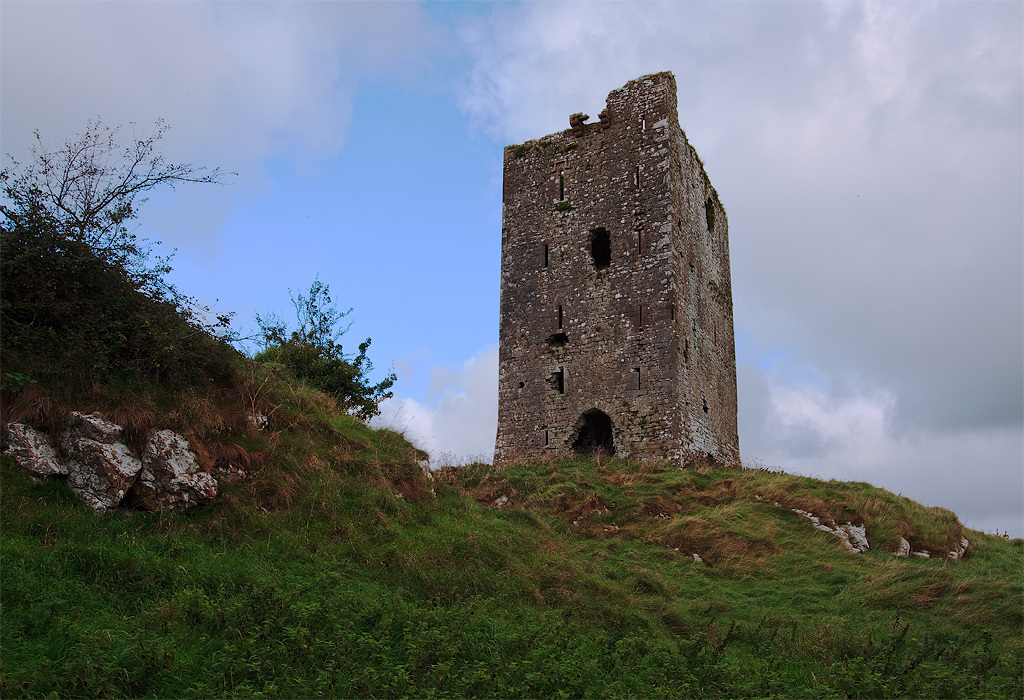
- Rockstown Castle, 2009.

- Location within Ireland
- 52°34′2.32″N 8°33′26″W
- Location: 3 miles (5 km) south of Ballyneety, County Limerick, Ireland

Rockstown Castle (Irish: Caisleán Bhaile na Carraige) is a ruined Irish tower house from medieval times in County Limerick, Ireland. It is located near the village of Ballyneety, 7 miles (11 km) from the city of Limerick. The castle, house, and surrounding land are privately owned and there is no public access.

== Description ==
The tower, with a square floor plan, stands on a rocky outcrop behind the ruins of Rockstown House. It has five floors. Most of the building is intact, but has some damage around the doorway above which there are the remains of a machicolation. It is well equipped with narrow defensive slits most of which have square heads. Some of those at the upper storeys have ogee heads. A trench is cut into the rock directly in front of the entrance door.

The first floor is missing but the ceiling is vaulted and the corner windows have deep recesses. A spiral stairway, lit by narrow slits, rises in the corner to roof level. Some of the slits have slopstones. The tower-house is similar to some Co Galway types with large rooms occupying the bulk of the building and small rectangular rooms leading off the stairway. The room on the second floor has an open fireplace in one corner, but the ceiling above is missing. The third floor also has a vaulted ceiling. There are good hinge stones at the doorways leading from the stairs.

There are three arched windows on the top floor that have deep recesses with round heads. Two of them are two-light and the third may be similar but it is greatly ruined. There are some narrow windows also. The roof is missing but there are some corbels in place. A small tower rises above roof level in one corner.
