= County Limerick (Parliament of Ireland constituency) =

Pre-1801 Irish constituency

- Former county constituency for the Irish House of Commons
- County: County Limerick

–1801
- Seats: 2
- Replaced by: County Limerick (UKHC)

County Limerick was a constituency represented in the Irish House of Commons until 1800.

== Members of Parliament ==
- 1376: Henry Berclay and Thomas Kildare were elected to come to England to consult with the king and council about the government of Ireland and about an aid for the king.
- 1420: David Lowys and William Love

Election	First MP	Second MP	Notes
1585	Sir Thomas Norris	Richard Bourke	
1613	Sir Francis Berkeley of Askeaton	Sir Thomas Browne Mills	
1639	Sir Edward Fitzharris, Kt (died 1641)	Sir Hardress Waller	
1654	Sir Hardress Waller	Henry Ingoldsby	Protectorate Parliaments Westminster; Also represented County Kerry and County Clare
1656	Sir Hardress Waller	Henry Ingoldsby	Protectorate Parliaments Westminster; Also represented County Kerry and County Clare
1659	Sir Hardress Waller	Henry Ingoldsby	Protectorate Parliaments Westminster; Also represented County Kerry and County Clare
1661	Sir William King	Robert Oliver	
1689	Sir John Fitzgerald, Bt	Gerald Fitzgerald	
1692	George Evans	Sir William King	
1695	Sir Thomas Southwell, 2nd Bt	Sir William King	
1703	Sir Thomas Southwell, 2nd Bt	Charles Oliver	
1707	Sir Thomas Southwell, 2nd Bt	George Evans	
1713	George King	George Evans	
1715	Sir Thomas Southwell, 2nd Bt	Robert Oliver	
1717	Hon. Thomas Southwell	Robert Oliver	
1721	Eyre Evans	Robert Oliver	
1727	Eyre Evans	Richard Southwell	
1729	Eyre Evans	Hon. Henry Southwell	
1759	Eyre Evans	Hugh Massy	
1761	Hon. Thomas George Southwell	Hugh Massy	
1767	Hon. Thomas Arthur Southwell	Hugh Massy	
1768	Silver Oliver	Hugh Massy	
1776	Silver Oliver	Sir Henry Hartstonge, 3rd Bt	
1783	Hon. Hugh Massy	Sir Henry Hartstonge, 3rd Bt	
1788	Richard Philip Oliver	Sir Henry Hartstonge, 3rd Bt	
1790	John Waller	John Massy	
1798	John Waller	William Odell	
1801	Replaced by Westminster constituency of County Limerick		
