= Thomas Southwell, 3rd Viscount Southwell =

Irish peer

Thomas Anthony Southwell, 3rd Viscount Southwell KP (25 February 1777 – 29 February 1860) was an Irish peer. He became Viscount Southwell in 1796 on the death of Thomas Southwell, 2nd Viscount Southwell and was appointed a Knight of the Order of St Patrick on 12 September 1837. He was lord of the manor of Garway at Garway House in Herefordshire.

== Marriage and family ==
The Irish peer married Jane, daughter of John Berkeley of Spetchley by Jane Compton. They had two sons and three daughters:

- The Hon. Thomas (d. 1829)
- The Hon. Charles (d. unm)
- The Hon. Paulina (d. young)
- The Hon. Sophia Catharina married 5 June 1830 Charles Auguste, Marquis de Choiseul-Beaupré (30 September 09/1782-29 June 1862)
- The Hon. Matilda Maria (d. 1882) married the Rt. Hon. Richard More O'Ferrall DL, JP, PC MP
- The Hon. Laura
- The Hon. Paulina

== Estates ==
On their marriage, Lord and Lady Southwell became joint owners of several properties including Longmores, Lodge Farm, Church Farm and Coleman's Farm; and later New House Farm, Cwm Madoc Farm, Garway Court, Great Demesne Farm, and the Darren Mill on the River Monnow. The whole estate comprised almost 3,000 acres. The lordship included riparian rights to take profits from the river; with excellent salmon fishing in Victorian times, it was a lucrative tenure holding. In 1808 it was held jointly between Southwell and Robert Cannings Esq, who were also entitled to sit at the Court Baron, appoint the steward, and pass sentence on legal cases such as encroachment, amercements, obstruction and presentment; and the appointment of a petty constable to the parish. Lord Southwell appointed Thomas Wakerman of Graig, another Roman Catholic, in 1810 to be his manor steward. Wakerman was also a solicitor and eminent local historian. Lord Southwell only visited the county on a few occasions, to shoot pheasants. The rest of the time he spent in Ireland, London and the south of France.

Peerage of Ireland
| Preceded by Thomas Southwell | Viscount Southwell; 1796–1860 | Succeeded by Thomas Southwell |
