= Chichester Phillips =

English-born politician in Ireland

Captain Chichester Phillips (1647–1728) was an English-born politician in seventeenth and early eighteenth-century Ireland. He sat as MP for Askeaton, County Limerick in the Irish House of Commons in the Parliament of 1695–1699. He was the owner of Drumcondra Castle, Dublin. He is chiefly remembered today for giving the land to create Ireland's first Jewish cemetery at Ballybough, Dublin.

Chichester Phillips was born in Balsham, Cambridge, England, in 1647 to Chichester Phillips and Susannah Warner, daughter of the Reverend Thomas Warner, vicar of Balsham, and his wife Anne Eaton. The Phillips family had a long-standing connection with Ireland: Chichester's grandfather Sir Thomas Phillips played a key part in the Plantation of Ulster. He founded the town of Limavady in 1610 and held lands at Coleraine: he was governor of the County of Coleraine. Sir Thomas died in London in 1636, leaving the Limavady estates to his eldest son Dudley. The junior branch of the family later settled in Dublin, where Chichester's father died in 1656. His mother remarried Sir Symon Eaton; she died in 1701.

He married Sarah Handcock, daughter of William Handcock, MP for County Westmeath and Abigail Stanley, in Longford, on 17 August 1685. They had six children: two daughters, Abigail Phillips Green, and Jane Phillips Blackburne, and four sons, Thomas, George, Marmaduke and Charles. Two of their sons became Church of Ireland clergymen: Rev. Charles Phillips became Rector of Kilcolman, Co. Cork, and Rev. Marmaduke Phillips MA (TCD) DD served in Inniscarra and Matehy, County Cork.

He was listed as an alderman of Dublin in 1696 and served in several regiments of foot as an ensign, lieutenant and captain. His last military appointment was as a captain in the Earl of Granard's Regiment of Foot under the colonelcy of Edward Brabazon, 4th Earl of Meath.

After the Glorious Revolution he took the side of William of Orange against James II of England. In 1691, as a reward for his loyalty to William's cause, the Commissioners for Forfeited Estates sold him lands at Killucan and Rathwire in County Westmeath which had been forfeited by the O'Mulledy family. In 1703 he purchased the freehold title to Drumcondra Castle. Ironically, his claim to Drumcondra was based originally on a lease from King James II.

Captain Phillips on 28 October 1718 leased a plot of land, on which Ballybough Cemetery was subsequently built, to the Ashkenazim, who had recently established a small community in Dublin. It is Ireland's oldest Jewish cemetery.
