= Richard Southwell (Limerick politician) =

Irish politician (c. 1671–1729)

Richard Southwell (c. 1671 – 17 September 1729) was an Irish politician.

He was the fifth and youngest son of Richard Southwell and his wife Lady Elizabeth O'Brien, daughter of Murrough O'Brien, 1st Earl of Inchiquin and Elizabeth St. Leger. His older brothers were Thomas Southwell, 1st Baron Southwell and William Southwell. During the Glorious Revolution of 1688, he and his brothers were attainted by the parliament of King James II of England. Southwell was High Sheriff of County Limerick in 1707. He was elected to the Irish House of Commons for County Limerick in 1727, representing the constituency until his death two years later. Southwell married Agnes Rose, daughter of George Rose of North Morgans, County Limerick, and by her, he had an only son, John. John married his cousin Sarah Rose, daughter of George's brother Henry Rose, a justice of the Court of King's Bench (Ireland), and had a daughter Agnes Elizabeth, who married John Wandesford, 1st Earl Wandesford.

He lived at Enniscourt, County Limerick.

Parliament of Ireland
| Preceded by Eyre Evans; Robert Oliver | Member of Parliament for County Limerick; 1727–1729; With: Eyre Evans | Succeeded by Eyre Evans; Hon. Henry Southwell |
