= Robert Taylor (Askeaton MP, died 1723) =

Irish politician (c. 1682–1723)

Robert Taylor (c. 1682–1723) was an Irish Member of Parliament.

== Biography ==
The son of Robert Taylor of Ballynort and brother of Berkeley Taylor, he sat in the Irish House of Commons for Askeaton from 1703 to 1714 and for Tralee from 1715 to his death, when he was succeeded by William Sprigge. In 1706 he was High Sheriff of County Limerick.
