= Henry Southwell (politician) =

Irish politician and soldier

Henry Southwell (September 1700 – 20 October 1758), styled The Honourable from 1717, was an Irish politician and soldier. He was the second son of Thomas Southwell, 1st Baron Southwell and his wife Lady Meliora Coningsby, eldest daughter of Thomas Coningsby, 1st Earl Coningsby and his first wife Barbara Gorges. His uncles were William Southwell and Richard Southwell. In 1729, Southwell entered the Irish House of Commons for County Limerick, the same constituency his father and his older brother Thomas had represented before, and sat for it until his death in 1758. He was appointed Deputy Governor of County Limerick and captain of a troop of grenadiers in 1735. He married Dulcinea Royse, daughter of Reverend Henry Royse, and had by her a son and two daughters.

Parliament of Ireland
Preceded by Eyre Evans; Richard Southwell	Member of Parliament for County Limerick; 1729–1758; With: Eyre Evans	Succeeded by Eyre Evans; Hugh Massy
