= William Southwell =

Irish politician and British Army officer

Member of the Irish House of Commons
- Constituency: Kinsale (1703–1713), Castlemartyr (1713–1715), Baltimore (1715–1720)

Personal details
- Born: 1669
- Died: 23 January 1720 (aged 50–51)
- Spouse: Lucy Bowen
- Parents: Richard Southwell (father); Lady Elizabeth O'Brien (mother)

Military service
- Allegiance: Kingdom of Great Britain
- Branch/service: British Army
- Years of service: 1693–1714
- Rank: Colonel
- Unit: 6th Regiment of Foot

William Southwell (1669 – 23 January 1720) was an Irish politician and British Army officer.

== Background ==
He was the third son of Richard Southwell of Castle Matrix, County Limerick, and his wife Lady Elizabeth O'Brien, daughter of Murrough O'Brien, 1st Earl of Inchiquin. His older brothers were Thomas Southwell, 1st Baron Southwell and Richard Southwell. During the Glorious Revolution of 1689, he and his brother were attainted by the parliament of King James II of England.

== Career ==
Southwell entered the British Army under King William III of England in 1693. During the Nine Years' War, he was wounded at the 2nd Siege of Namur in 1695 and was afterwards promoted to captain. In the War of the Spanish Succession, he took part in the Battle of Cádiz and Battle of Vigo Bay as major of the 6th Foot in 1702. He was promoted to lieutenant-colonel a year later. Southwell commanded four hundred grenadiers in the 1st Siege of Barcelona in 1705 and was made colonel of the 6th Regiment of Foot the following year. He sold his colonelcy to Thomas Harrison in 1708 and was appointed captain of the Battleaxe Guards in 1714, protecting the Lord Lieutenant of Ireland.

He was elected to the Irish House of Commons for Kinsale in 1703, representing the constituency until 1713. Subsequently, Southwell sat for Castlemartyr until 1715 and then for Baltimore until his death in 1720.

== Family ==
In 1709, he married Lucy Bowen, younger daughter of William Bowen, of Ballyadams, County Laois, a grandson of Sir William Domville, Attorney General for Ireland. By her he had six sons and nine daughters. His third son, and eventual heir, Bowen was a Member of Parliament for Downpatrick.

Parliament of Ireland
Preceded by Edward Southwell; James Weller	Member of Parliament for Kinsale; 1703–1713; With: Henry Hawley	Succeeded by Henry Hawley; Edward Southwell
Preceded by Robert FitzGerald; St John Brodrick	Member of Parliament for Castlemartyr; 1713–1715; With: Robert Oliver	Succeeded by Bartholomew Purdon; Charles Coote
Preceded by Richard Barry; Michael Beecher	Member of Parliament for Baltimore; 1715–1720; With: Michael Beecher	Succeeded by Sir Percy Freke, 2nd Bt; Michael Beecher
Military offices
Preceded by James Rivers	Colonel of the 6th Regiment of Foot; 1706–1708	Succeeded by Thomas Harrison
