= Kilgobbin House =

Country house in County Limerick, Ireland

Coordinates: 52°35′N 8°46′W

Kilgobbin House is a country house in Adare, County Limerick, Ireland.

Kilgobbin was the original seat of the Quin family, and mostly served as the dower house after the construction of Adare Manor. In 1777, Sir Richard Quin, later created 1st Earl of Dunraven, married Lady Frances Muriel Fox-Strangways, a daughter of Stephen Fox-Strangways, 1st Earl of Ilchester. Richard's father, Windham Quin, gave him Kilgobbin, where the couple lived until Quin inherited Adare Manor. In the 1980s, Thady Wyndham-Quin, 7th Earl of Dunraven and Mount-Earl, sold Adare Manor, and Kilgobbin returned to being the family seat. The peerages became extinct on the death of the 7th Earl in 2011.
