= Windham Wyndham-Quin, 4th Earl of Dunraven and Mount-Earl =

Irish nobleman and politician (1841–1926)

The Right Honourable The Earl of Dunraven KP CMG PC
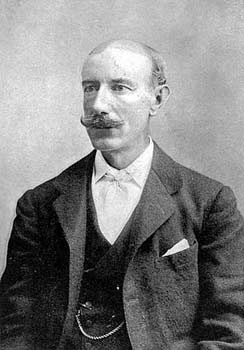
- Lord Dunraven

Senator
- In office 11 December 1922 – 14 June 1926

Under-Secretary of State for the Colonies
- In office 24 June 1885 – 28 January 1886
- Monarch: Victoria
- Prime Minister: The Marquess of Salisbury
- Preceded by: Evelyn Ashley
- Succeeded by: George Osborne Morgan
- In office 3 August 1886 – 16 February 1887
- Monarch: Victoria
- Prime Minister: The Marquess of Salisbury
- Preceded by: George Osborne Morgan
- Succeeded by: The Earl of Onslow

Member of the House of Lords
- Lord Temporal
- Baron Kenry; 6 October 1871 – 14 June 1926
- Preceded by: Edwin Wyndham-Quin, 3rd Earl
- Succeeded by: None, title extinct

Personal details
- Born: 12 February 1841 County Limerick, Ireland
- Died: 14 June 1926 (aged 85) London, England
- Party: Conservative; Independent
- Spouse: Florence Kerr
- Children: 3
- Parent: Edwin Wyndham-Quin, 3rd Earl (father)
- Education: Christ Church, Oxford

Windham Thomas Wyndham-Quin, 4th Earl of Dunraven and Mount-Earl, KP, CMG, PC (Ire) (12 February 1841 – 14 June 1926), styled Viscount Adare between 1850 and 1871, was an Anglo-Irish journalist, landowner, soldier, sportsman and Conservative politician.

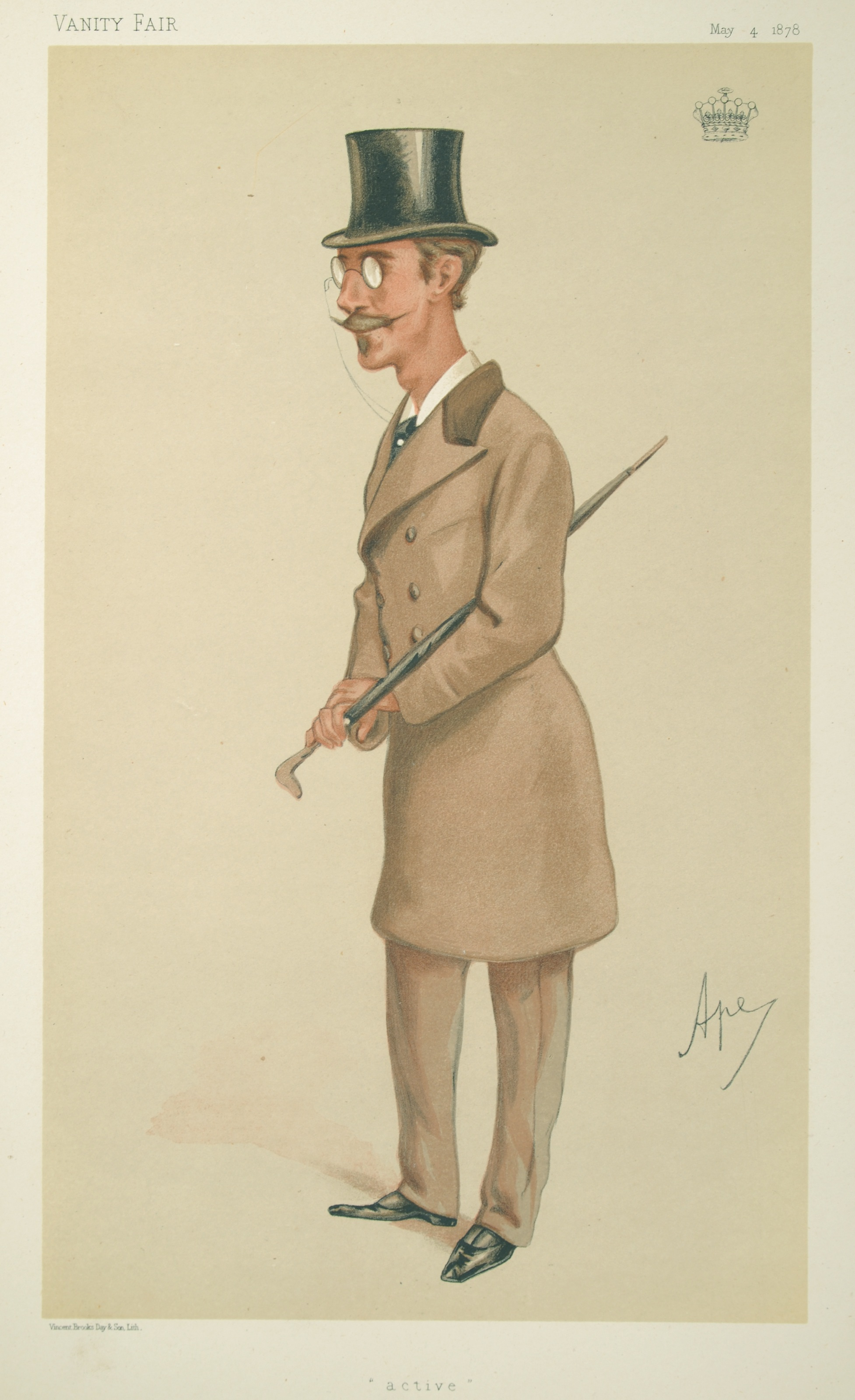
"Active". Caricature by Ape published in Vanity Fair in 1878

He served as Under-Secretary of State for the Colonies under Lord Salisbury from 1885 to 1886 and 1886 to 1887. He also successfully presided over the 1902 Land Conference and was the founder of the Irish Reform Association. He recruited two regiments of sharpshooters, leading them in the Boer War and later establishing a unit in Ireland. He held the office of a Senator of the Irish Free State from 1922 to 1926.

A big game hunter, in 1874 Dunraven claimed 15,000 acres (23 sq mi; 61 km^{2}) in Estes Park, Colorado, United States, determined to make the area a game park. He built a tourist hotel there but sold the land in the early 20th century, as he was under continuous pressure from settlers trying to encroach on his holdings.

== Early years ==
Lord Dunraven was born at the family seat, Adare Manor, County Limerick, the only son of The 3rd Earl of Dunraven by his first wife, Florence Augusta Goold, third daughter of Thomas Goold, Master in Chancery. His early years were spent at Dunraven Castle, Glamorgan, Wales. He was educated at Christ Church, Oxford. While part of the Protestant Ascendancy, the Quin (Irish: Ó Cuinn) family of Adare descended of Gaelic-Irish nobility as a prominent branch of the Dalcassians; they had several-times married into the Wyndham family, from whence they inherited Dunraven Castle and which members included the Earl of Egremont and Baron Leconfield.

After serving as a lieutenant in the 1st Life Guards, a cavalry regiment, Dunraven became, at age twenty-six, a war correspondent for the London newspaper The Daily Telegraph. He covered the Abyssinian War in Africa. In this capacity, he shared a tent with Henry Stanley of The New York Herald.

Dunraven became a special correspondent for a "big London daily" during the Franco-Prussian War in 1870–71. He reported the Siege of Paris, saw the Third Carlist War and war in Turkey, and probably the Russo-Turkish War. Dunraven witnessed both the signing of the Treaty of Versailles, which ended the Franco-Prussian War in 1871, and later the signing of the Treaty of Versailles to end the Great War in 1919.

== Military career ==
Dunraven served as an ensign of the 4th Company, Oxford University Rifle Volunteer Corps 30 December 1859, promoted lieutenant on 1 March 1860, resigned 3 December 1861, Cornet and sub-lieutenant, 1st Life Guards, 2 June 1865, purchased promotion to lieutenant on the same date (which was customary at the time). Extra Aide-de-Camp to the Lord Lieutenant of Ireland 1864. Retired from 1st Guards 1 February 1867. He was a lieutenant in the Gloucestershire Yeomanry Cavalry and resigned his Commission on 9 June 1875. He was appointed Honorary Colonel of the Glamorgan Artillery (Western Division) Royal Artillery on 17 April 1895. He was appointed to the Honorary Colonelcy of the 5th Battalion, the Royal Munster Fusiliers, on 25 August 1897.

== Boer War and the Sharpshooters ==
During the early stages of the South African War 1899–1902, the British Army suffered defeats at the hands of the Boer Commandos, composed of men who were first-class shots and good horsemen. The effect in the United Kingdom was to inspire a rush of volunteers. The Earl of Dunraven formed a committee in Dec 1899 to raise a squadron of 'Sharpshooters' from those volunteers who could both ride and shoot well. By March 1900, a full battalion (18th Bn Imperial Yeomanry) had been raised.

On 6 April 1900, Dunraven's Sharpshooters left Southampton for South Africa on the SS Galeka. Lord Dunraven at the last moment decided to accompany the force and was posted as a supernumerary captain on the battalion staff, travelling with the battalion. He was gazetted on 17 April 1900 to be Captain (Supernumerary) of the 18th Battalion of the Imperial Yeomanry, with the temporary rank of captain in the Army, from 18 April 1900, which he relinquished in July 1901. He was mentioned in despatches (29 November 1900) by Lord Roberts, Commander-in-Chief during the early part of the war.

In January 1901, the government made a further call for yeomanry and between February and March, another 1,200 men were recruited by the Sharpshooters Committee. They were formed into two battalions, the 21st and 23rd. The Sharpshooters fought many small-scale actions against the Boers, with increasing skill, and showed the value of mobile, well-armed and resourceful troops. Following their success, Lord Dunraven was given permission to raise a regiment for service at home. On 23 July 1901, the 3rd County of London (Sharpshooters) Imperial Yeomanry was formally organized.

On 25 March 1902 Dunraven resigned his commission and received a new commission, subject to the provisions of the Militia and Yeomanry Act, 1901, retaining his rank and seniority as Lieutenant-Colonel (Honorary Captain in the Army). In the November 1902 Birthday Honours list he was appointed a Companion of the Order of Saint Michael and Saint George (CMG) for his service in South Africa.

On 22 November 1903, Major-General Baden-Powell, Inspector of Cavalry, unveiled a memorial in the Church of St Martin's in the Fields. About 400 men of all ranks of 3CLY under the command of Colonel Lord Dunraven attended the ceremony. On 6 August 1904 he was appointed to the Honorary Colonelcy of the Regiment. In 1904 the Regiment's first battle honour South Africa 1900-02 was awarded.

== Political career ==
Dunraven succeeded his father in the earldom in 1871 and took his seat in the House of Lords. He served as Under-Secretary of State for the Colonies under Lord Salisbury from 1885 to 1886 and again from 1886 to 1887. From 1888 to 1890 he was chairman of the Commission on Sweated Labour. As a constructive moderate Unionist he sought to bring about a peaceful solution to the Irish land question and to the demand for Home Rule. In 1897 he published The Outlook in Ireland, the case for Devolution and Conciliation which was reprinted in 1907.

Dunraven was an inaugural member of Glamorgan County Council, representing Bridgend as a Conservative between 1889 and 1892. He also sat as Moderate Party councillor representing Wandsworth on the London County Council from 1895 to 1899.

Dunraven was the owner of the 39,000-acre (160 km^{2}) Adare Manor estate at Adare, County Limerick. Following the initiative of George Wyndham, the Chief Secretary for Ireland, he was instrumental in forming the 1902 Land Conference of which he was chairman, representing the landlord side. Together with William O'Brien, who represented the tenant side, the conference resulted in the publication of a unanimous report in January which led to the enactment of the Land Purchase (Ireland) Act 1903. This terminated the last vestige of absentee landlordism in Ireland and enabled tenants to purchase land from their landlords under favourable financial provisions.

After presiding over the Land Conference, Lord Dunraven founded the Irish Reform Association. While reflecting primarily the views of progressive landlords like him, it was intended to rally all those who wished to see the 'conference policy' applied to other spheres of Irish life. In the course of 1904, this body produced a scheme of "devolution"—that is, for granting to Ireland limited powers of local self-government. The Under-Secretary for Ireland, Sir Antony MacDonnell, had a hand in drafting it.

It was greeted at first as a significant step towards self-government, while not Home Rule. Such a policy failed to gain sufficient nationalist support, and the new proposals were dismissed by John Dillon. Unionists responded by forming the Ulster Unionist Council in 1905. For Dillon, devolution was not enough; for the alarmed Ulster Unionists, it was a Trojan Horse for Home Rule. In the end, the controversy resulted in Chief Secretary George Wyndham being driven in ignominy from office.

Dunraven was also a member of the Order of Saint Patrick. On the foundation of the Irish Free State, he became a member of the first Senate in December 1922 and served until his resignation in January 1926. He was nominated to the Senate by the President of the Executive Council, W. T. Cosgrave, as part of assurances during the 1921 negotiation of the Anglo-Irish Treaty given by Arthur Griffith to southern unionists and the British government that unionists would have adequate representation in the new parliament to safeguard their interests.

== Colorado huntsman ==
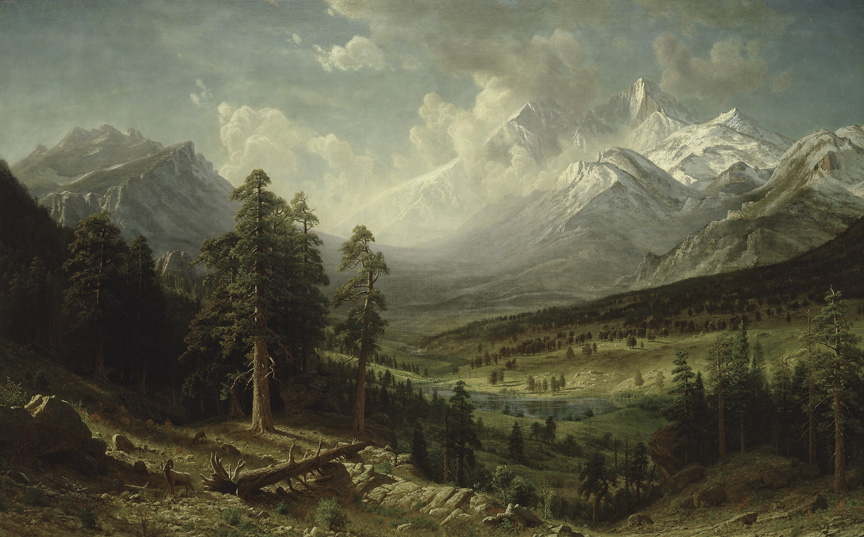
Albert Bierstadt was commissioned by the Earl of Dunraven to make a painting of the Estes Park and Longs Peak area in 1876 for $15,000. The painting, originally displayed in Dunraven Castle, is now in the collection of the Denver Art Museum.

Lord Dunraven spent much of his leisure time hunting wild game in various parts of the world. After hearing of the fine hunting in the American West, he decided to visit. He first arrived in 1872, and met and befriended Texas Jack Omohundro, who acted as a guide and led the earl's party on buffalo and elk hunts. Reuniting with Texas Jack on his second visit to the American west in 1874, he explored Yellowstone Park. This trip would be documented in his book Hunting in the Yellowstone or On the Trail of the Wapiti with Texas Jack in the Land of Geysers. Later on the same trip, the young earl decided to make the whole of Estes Park, Colorado into a game preserve for the exclusive use of himself and his British friends. By stretching the provisions of the Homestead Act and pre-emption rights, Dunraven claimed 15,000 acres (23 sq mi; 61 km^{2}) in what later was designated as the present-day Rocky Mountain National Park. His efforts resulted in what has been called "one of the most gigantic land steals in the history of Colorado". The coming of more settlers in 1874 and 1875 stopped this wholesale appropriation of land.

In 1876, the earl commissioned Albert Bierstadt to make a painting on canvas of Longs Peak and Estes Park for US $15,000, equivalent to $453,516 in 2025. He intended to hang it in Dunraven Castle. Bierstadt travelled with Theodore Whyte, the earl's associate, to the area and visited locations to make sketches and paintings; Whyte was also working to identify a site for an English hotel for the Earl. The completed painting is now held in the Denver Public Library's art collection. Although for 33 years Dunraven considered the Park his personal property, the settlers did not. Their hostility forced him to give up the game preserve idea.

Dunraven later described the influx of settlers and his consequent plans:

Folks were drifting in, prospecting ... preempting, making claims; so we prepared for civilization. Made a better road, bought a sawmill at San Francisco, hauled the machinery in, set it up, felled trees, and built a wooden hotel...

— The 4th Lord Dunraven

== Tourist enterprise ==
Bierstadt, commissioned by Dunraven to paint at Estes Park, also helped select the site for Dunraven's 'English Hotel', which was built in 1877. It was situated in a meadow east of the present Estes Park village, and was the first strictly tourist hotel built in the Park. The hotel was a three-story, timber-frame building. It had twelve narrow windows, and a large door opening onto a one-storied, columned porch. The roof of this porch formed an open deck surrounded by a small hand railing. The porch ran the full length of the front of the building and about halfway around each end.

Despite the success of this 'English Hotel and Lodge', the disillusioned Dunraven left the area forever in the late 1880s. He later said:

People came in disputing claims, kicking up rows: exorbitant land taxes got into arrears; and we were in constant litigation. The show could not be managed from home, and we were in constant danger of being frozen out. So we sold for what we could get and cleared out, and I have never been there since.

— Lord Dunraven

Dunraven realised it would be impossible for him to control all of the park region; in 1907 he sold his property to B. D. Sanborn of Greeley, Colorado and F. O. Stanley of Newton, Massachusetts. Stanley later built the historic Stanley Hotel in Estes Park. Dunraven's wooden 'English Hotel' burned to the ground in 1911.

== Sportsman ==
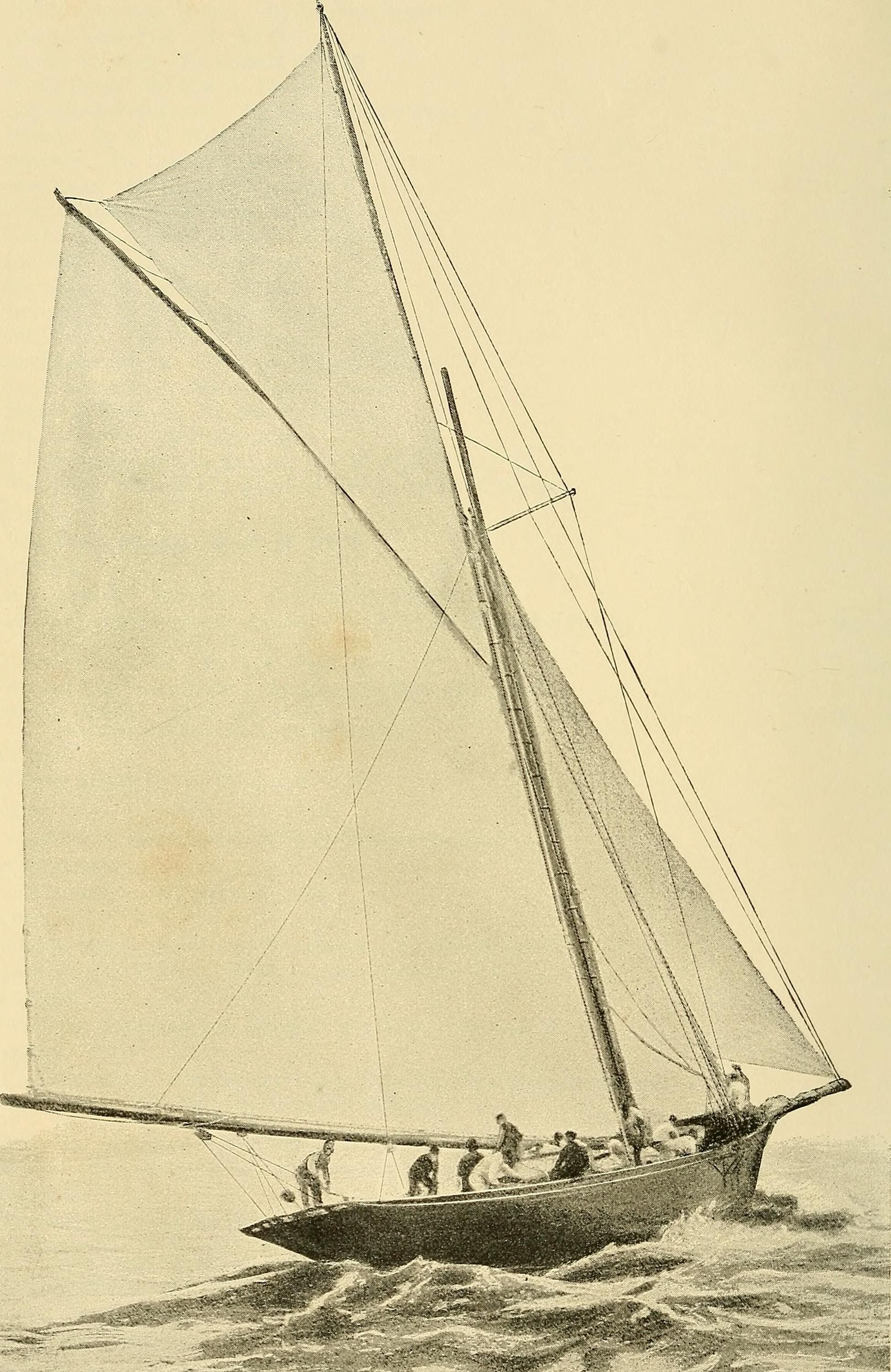
Valkyrie I

Lord Dunraven maintained an equestrian stud farm on his Adare Manor estate. He experimented in growing tobacco until his factory was burned down in 1916. A keen yachtsman, the earl was the owner and co-owner of the 1893 and 1895 America's Cup yachts Valkyrie II and Valkyrie III. On returning home in 1896 from Newport, Rhode Island, Dunraven alleged cheating by the winning American yacht, Defender. As a sportsman, he wrote Canadian Nights about "life and sports in the Rockies".

== Family and personal life ==
Headstone

Lord Dunraven married Florence Kerr, second daughter of Lord Charles Kerr. The latter was the first son of The 6th Marquess of Lothian by his second wife.

The Dunravens had three children:

- Lady Florence Enid Wyndham-Quin (13 June 1870 – July 1891).
- Lady Rachael Charlotte Wyndham-Quin (20 February 1872 – 30 January 1901), married Desmond FitzJohn Lloyd FitzGerald, 27th Knight of Glin and had children.
- Lady Aileen May Wyndham-Quin (9 April 1873 – 25 February 1962), married Lord Ardee, who later became, in 1929, The 13th Earl of Meath, and had children.

In 1869, Lord Dunraven revealed in his diaries, under the title Experiences in Spiritualism with D. D. Home, that he had slept in the same bed with Daniel Dunglas Home. Many of the diary entries contain erotic homosexual references between Home and the then Lord Adare.

From 1900 onwards Lord Dunraven developed the gardens on "Garinish Island" (near Sneem, County Kerry, Ireland), which he had inherited from his father, The 3rd Earl of Dunraven, into a subtropical wild garden. It is still in existence today. The house, called "Garinish Lodge", was burned in September 1922 during the Irish Civil War (1922–1923), but later rebuilt.

Lord Dunraven died in June 1926 at his home in Park Lane, London, aged 85. As he died without a male heir, the earldom passed to a cousin, Windham Wyndham-Quin, 5th Earl of Dunraven. The barony of Kenry, which had been created for his father, became extinct. He left all his unsettled property (acquired during his lifetime), including Garinish Island, his yacht and racehorses to his only surviving child, Aileen. All the settled property, which included Adare Manor and other properties there, as well as Dunraven Castle estate and several valuable coal mines in South Wales, was left to his successor, his cousin. Dunraven was buried at St. Nicholas' Church of Ireland in Adare, County Limerick, Ireland. In 1895 Dunraven had lived at 27 Norfolk Street.

He held almost 40,000 acres in Ireland and Wales; with 24,000 in Glamorgan, 14,000 in County Limerick, 1,000 in County Kerry and 100 in County Clare, as well as 500 acres in Gloucestershire.

== Legacy and honours ==
In 1939, 13 years after his death, Norfolk Street (London, Mayfair) was renamed as Dunraven Street in his honour. Dunraven Pass on the Grand Loop Road between Tower and Canyon in Yellowstone National Park is named after Lord Dunraven, as is nearby Dunraven Peak, a 9,869 feet (3,008 m) mountain peak in the Washburn Range.

Political offices
| Preceded by Evelyn Ashley | Under-Secretary of State for the Colonies; 1885–1886 | Succeeded by George Osborne Morgan |
| Preceded by George Osborne Morgan | Under-Secretary of State for the Colonies; 1886–1887 | Succeeded by The Earl of Onslow |
Honorary titles
| Preceded by Thomas Enraght O'Brien | Lord Lieutenant of Limerick; 1896–1922 | Office abolished |
Peerage of Ireland
| Preceded by Edwin Wyndham-Quin | Earl of Dunraven and Mount-Earl; 1871–1926 | Succeeded by Windham Wyndham-Quin |
Peerage of the United Kingdom
| Preceded by Edwin Wyndham-Quin | Baron Kenry; 1871–1926 | Extinct |
