= Thady Wyndham-Quin, 7th Earl of Dunraven and Mount-Earl =

Earl in the Peerage of Ireland (1939–2011)

Thady Windham Thomas Wyndham-Quin, 7th Earl of Dunraven and Mount-Earl (27 October 1939 – 25 March 2011) was an Irish hereditary peer.

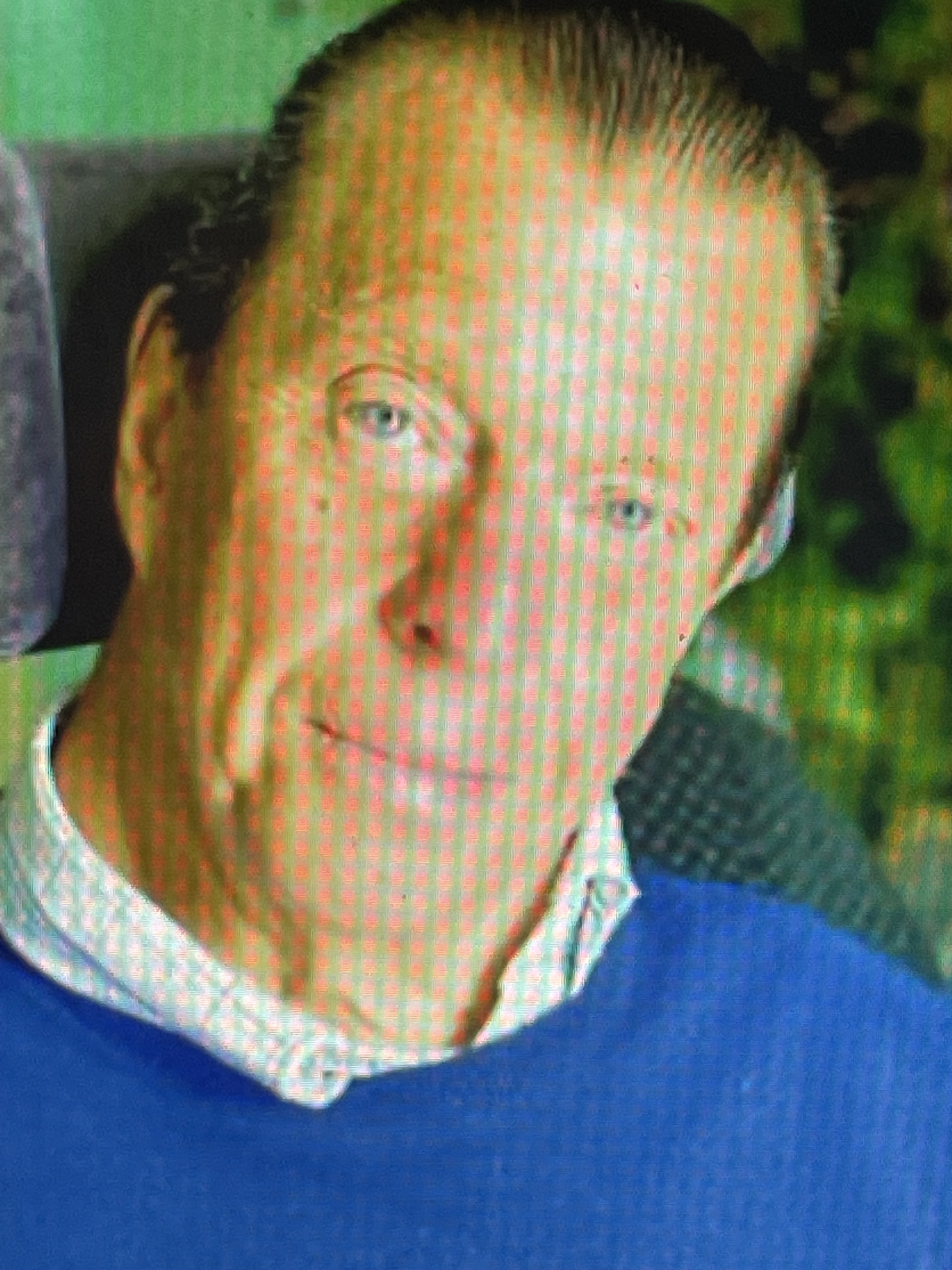
Pictured is Thady Wyndham Quin

== Early life ==
Lord Dunraven was born in 1939, the third child and only son of Richard Wyndham-Quin, 6th Earl of Dunraven and Mount-Earl and his wife Nancy Yuille. He was educated at Ludgrove School and at the Institut Le Rosey, Switzerland. In 1956, while a schoolboy, he contracted polio in the Cork epidemic and was a wheelchair user for the rest of his life.

He received the benefit of Swiss medical expertise in treating the disease, but he used a wheelchair for the rest of his life.

He succeeded to the earldom and its subsidiary titles in 1965 upon the death of his father.

== Career ==
Lord Dunraven sold the ancestral home of Adare Manor and its 840 acres in 1984 to Irish-American businessman Tom Kane. The manor was converted into the Adare Manor Hotel. Thereafter he lived with his family at nearby Kilgobbin House.

The family also owned the Dunraven Arms Hotel which was sold to hotelier Brian Murphy and is now owned by Louis Murphy.

He was chairman of the Irish Wheelchair Association for two decades. The Dunraven Centre, a disability resource centre at Limerick Enterprise Development Park, is named after him.

Lord Dunraven spent much time studying advances in other countries in facilities provided for people who use wheelchairs and used this information in many submissions to government. In a tribute by the Irish Wheelchair Association they described Lord Thady Dunraven as "a man who worked to make this country totally accessible to people with disabilities".

As president of the wheelchair association until 1991, he advocated for greater accessibility to public spaces, an issue that had previously received little attention. There were no official figures to the number of disabled in Ireland and there was a lack of information about their needs. The Irish Wheelchair Association said Lord Dunraven used his title and status to help others as well, as he could articulate the needs of the disabled and push a response at government level.

Lord Dunraven was also a patron to the local school in Adare which was built by his anscestors.

== Marriage and children ==
On 15 February 1969, Dunraven married Geraldine McAleer, daughter of Air Commodore Gerard Ward McAleer, CBE, MB, BCh. They had one daughter:

- Lady Ana Elizabeth Wyndham-Quin (born 20 March 1972), married Duncan Johnson in 2009.

After his passing, his wife Lady Geraldine Wyndham-Quin devoted her time to keeping his legacy alive by campaigning for people who suffer with disabilities in Ireland and spreading awareness about the need for more facilities for the disabled in Ireland as well. The Dunraven estates continued to be operated by Lady Geraldine and their daughter Lady Ana.

Lady Geraldine has presented different lectures about the history of Lord Thady Wyndham-Quin and his anscestors, where she delves into topics such as how the family came to wealth through coal mines and that it was the coal industry that built the famous Adare Manor.

The First Lord of Dunraven lived in Kilgobbin House and all the other Lords of Dunraven have returned to live there with their own families.

== Death ==
Lord Dunraven died at his home on 25 March 2011, at the age of 71 after suffering from a short illness. As he had no sons and as there were no other surviving male line descendants of the 1st Earl, the earldom and subsidiary titles became extinct upon his death.

== Ancestry ==
Ancestors of Thady Wyndham-Quin, 7th Earl of Dunraven and Mount-Earl

16. Windham Quin, 2nd Earl of Dunraven and Mount-Earl
8. Hon. Windham Wyndham-Quin
17. Caroline Wyndham
4. Windham Wyndham-Quin, 5th Earl of Dunraven and Mount-Earl
18. George Tyler
9. Caroline Tyler
19. Harriet Sullivan
2. Richard Wyndham-Quin, 6th Earl of Dunraven and Mount-Earl
20. Robert Bourke, 5th Earl of Mayo
10. Richard Bourke, 6th Earl of Mayo
21. Anne Jocelyn
5. Lady Eva Bourke
22. George Wyndham, 1st Baron Leconfield
11. Hon. Blanche Wyndham
23. Mary Blunt
1. Thady Wyndham-Quin, 7th Earl of Dunraven and Mount-Earl
?
?
?
6. Thomas Yuille
?
?
?
3. Nancy Yuille
28. John Long
14. John Long
29. Melissa Williams
7. Nancy Long
?
15. Sallie Ridley
?

Peerage of Ireland
Preceded by Richard Wyndham-Quin	Earl of Dunraven and Mount-Earl; 1965–2011	Extinct
