= Thomas Goold =

Thomas Goold (c. 1766–1846), also spelt Gould, was a master of the Court of Chancery (Ireland). He served briefly in the Irish House of Commons and held office as Serjeant-at-law.

Goold was born of a wealthy Protestant family in Cork, the second son of John Goold and Mary Anne Quin, daughter of Valentine Quin of Adare, County Limerick, and Mary Wyndham. The Goold Baronets of Oldcourt, County Cork, were close relatives. Thomas inherited lands in County Limerick from his uncle, John Quin, and a substantial fortune from his father.

Coming to Dublin about 1789, he proceeded to squander most of his patrimony in roistering and entertainments, at which future leaders in the legal and political spheres like Henry Grattan, William Saurin, Charles Kendal Bushe, William Plunket, 1st Baron Plunket, and others, are said to have been present. He travelled extensively on the Continent. Wolfe Tone, who was not a friend, satirised Goold in his novel Belmont Castle as an idle fop. Having come to the end of his resources, he applied himself zealously to practice at the bar, to which he had been called in 1791. A pamphlet in defence of Burke's Reflections on the French Revolution "against all his opponents", based on his own first-hand observation of conditions in France, gained him the honour of an invitation to Beaconsfield to meet Edmund Burke himself, and an introduction to William Fitzwilliam, 4th Earl Fitzwilliam, made useless by the Viceroy's prompt recall.

He was a "strenuous and vehement opponent of the Act of Union". In 1799, Goold wrote an "Address to the People of Ireland on the subject of the projected Union", and sat in the last session of the Parliament of Ireland for Kilbeggan as a member of the opposition.

In 1818, he gave evidence at the bar of the House of Commons upon the inquiry into the conduct of Windham Quin, later 2nd Earl of Dunraven, who was accused of corruption following the 1818 General Election, but exonerated. The two men, who were second cousins through Goold's mother, Mary Quin, later became closely linked by marriage, when Dunraven's eldest son and heir married Goold's daughter.

Meanwhile, his practice had been rapidly increasing. In 1824, W. H. Curran called him one of the most prominent members of the Irish bar, and he had been appointed Third Serjeant-at-law in the previous year. Indeed, it has been said that he was the best nisi prius lawyer who ever held a brief at the Irish bar. In 1830, he was appointed First Serjeant, and he was made a master in chancery in 1832. He died at Lissadell, County Sligo, the seat of his son-in-law, Sir Robert Gore-Booth, 4th Baronet, on 16 July 1846.

Thomas and his wife Elizabeth Nixon, daughter of the Reverend Brinsley Nixon of Painstown, County Meath, and Mary Hartigan, had six children in all: three sons, including the Right Reverend Frederick Goold, Archdeacon of Raphoe, and three daughters, including Caroline, Lady Gore-Booth, and Augusta, who married her distant cousin, Edwin Wyndham-Quin, 3rd Earl of Dunraven and Mount-Earl.

== Sources ==
- Stephen, Leslie; Lee, Sidney, eds. (1890). "Goold, Thomas" . Dictionary of National Biography. Vol. 22. London: Smith, Elder & Co.
- Geoghegan, Patrick M. "Goold (Gould), Thomas" Cambridge Dictionary of National Biography
