= Kenry =

Barony in County Limerick, Ireland

Kenry Caonraí (Irish)
- Barony
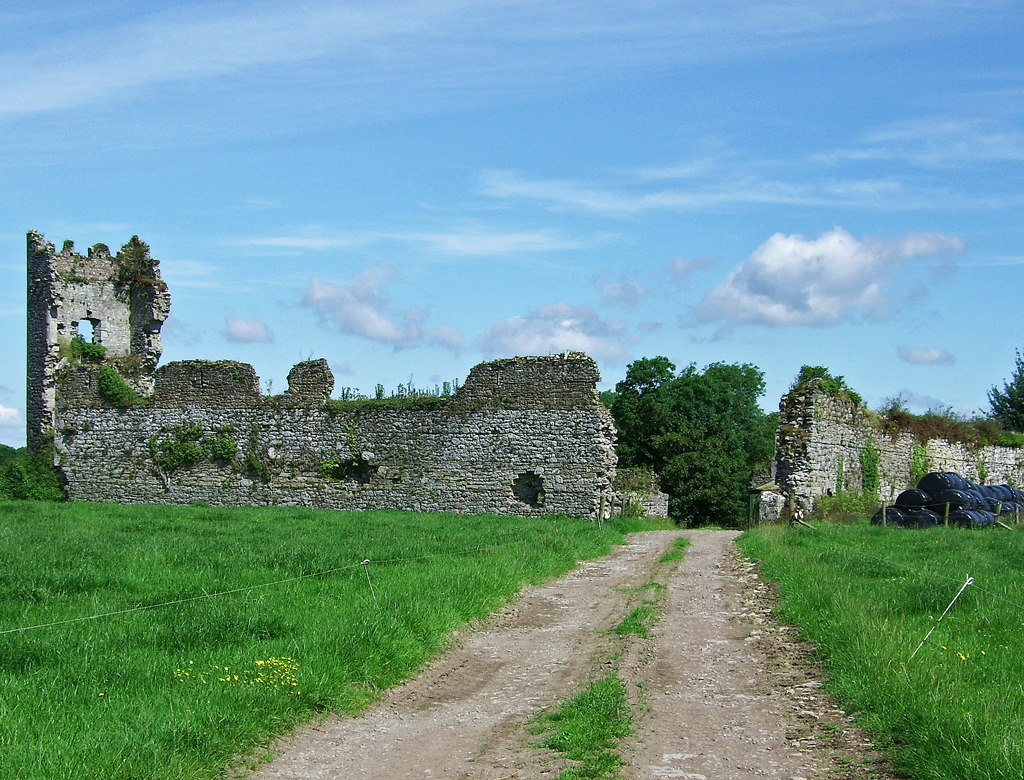
- Kenry Castle at Shanpallas, near Pallaskenry

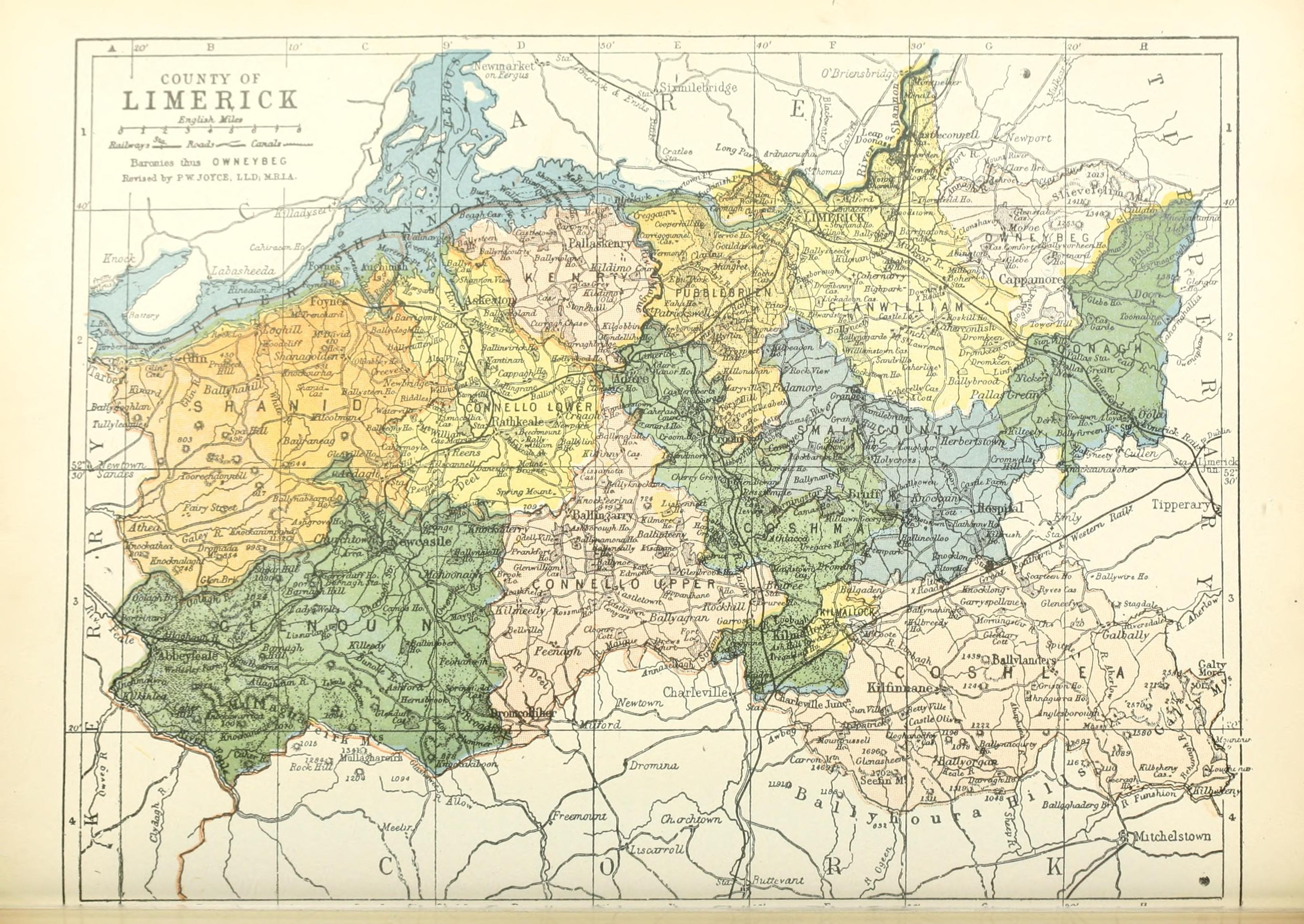
- Barony map of County Limerick, 1900; Kenry is in the north-centre, coloured pink.

- Location within Ireland
- Coordinates: 52°37′N 8°52′W
- Sovereign state: Ireland
- Province: Munster
- County: Limerick

Area
  - Total: 106.1 km^{2} (41.0 sq mi)

Kenry (/ˈkɛnriː/: Irish: Caonraí) is a historical barony in northern County Limerick, Ireland.

Baronies were mainly cadastral rather than administrative units. They acquired modest local taxation and spending functions in the 19th century before being superseded by the Local Government (Ireland) Act 1898.

== History ==
The barony takes its name from the Gaelic Irish Cáenraige, "Cáen's tribe." The Cáenraige were ruled by the Uí Fidgenti from the 3rd to 10th centuries AD, when the Ó Donnabháin (Donovans) took it from them; they were rulers of the Uí Chairbre prior to this and their new territory became known as Caonraighe Ui Chaibre. In the 12th century, Donal Mor O'Brien and the Anglo-Normans drove the Donovans into West Cork and Kerry. Kenry gave its name to Kenry Castle, which in turn gave its name to Pallaskenry ("palisade of Kenry").

The Book of Lecan connects Kenry to the legendary harper Uaithne, with his sons Uaithnia, Druithnia and Caínnia being the ancestors of the Uaithni, Dál Druithne and Cáenraige.

The Annals of the Four Masters describes an assault on Kenry in 1581 during the Second Desmond Rebellion (translated by John O'Donovan):

Upon one occasion a bold and merciless body of the soldiers of Adare, having been divided into two parties, went forth, one by water, the other by land, to traverse Kenry and the lands lying along the side of the Mangue, to seek for fight or booty from some of the plunderers. These two parties, having met together in the neighbourhood of Baile-Ui Chathlain [Ballyculhane], were encountered by David Oge, the son of David of the Lake [David an Locha], son of Thomas, son of John, son of Thomas, son of Philip, son of the Knight, and his forces, who charged them, and proceeded to pierce and surround them, so that he left them but a heap of bloody trunks and mangled carcasses; so that not many of them escaped without being slaughtered on that spot by David and his people. When the news of this reached Adare, the captain of that town assembled the soldiers of Kilmallock, and set out at the head of a vigorous and merciless body of troops to traverse Kenry, in order to see whether he could find man or men upon whom to wreak his vengeance for the slaughter of his people. He arrived at Baile-Ui-Chathlain, one of the castles of Purcell, who had assisted the Crown from the very commencement of the war between the English and the Geraldines to that time. The captain slew one hundred and fifty women and children, and of every sort of persons that he met with inside and outside of that castle. The David already named, who had slain the captain's people, was a man who had gone through much toil and trouble in the war of the Geraldines with the English. On one occasion he set out with sixteen men in the month of December from the borders of Kenry, in a small, narrow cot [wooden boat]. They rowed in a north-westerly direction through the Shannon Harbour, and put in at Inis-Cathaigh, where they stopped for that night. When Turlough, the son of Teige, son of Murrough, son of Teige Roe, son of Turlough (the son of Mac Mahon, from East Corca-Bhaiscinn), heard that David had passed by him, he launched a boat upon the blue-streamed Shannon in the early part of the night, and entering it with the number of men he had along with him, he made no delay until he reached Inis-Cathaigh, and landed on the strand of the fair island. They then went to the house in which David was, and immediately set fire to it. David, with his people, quickly came out, unarmed, casting himself on the mercy of the son of Mac Mahon, who instantly took him and his people prisoners. The son of Mac Mahon returned on that night to Baile-mhic-Colmain [Colmanstown], taking his prisoners with him. On the following day David's people were hanged on the nearest trees they met; and the heroic soldier himself was sent to Limerick, where he was immediately put to death.

Kenry barony was created in the 17th century under English rule by Sir William Ellison. It was divided in two parts for the purpose of taxation: Kenrymore (Great Kenry, composed of the civil parishes of Kilcornan and Iveruss) being the smaller part and largely owned by the Knights of Glin, while Kenryhurragh (Caenraighe Oirthearach, "eastern Kenry"), composed of the civil parishes of Adare, Kildimo, Ardcanny and Chapelrussell, was subject to the Earls of Desmond. The spellings Kenryemore, Kenryehurraghe, Kenry Lurragh are also found.

The Anglo-Irish aristocrat Edwin Wyndham-Quin, 3rd Earl of Dunraven and Mount-Earl was named Baron Kenry in 1866 when he was raised to the British peerage and given a seat in the House of Lords. It passed to Windham Wyndham-Quin, 4th Earl of Dunraven and Mount-Earl in 1871. He had no sons so the title became extinct on his death.

The name is used today by the Kenry Historical Society.

== Geography ==
Kenry is in the north-centre of the county, bounded to the north by the Shannon Estuary and to the east and south by the River Maigue.

== List of settlements ==
Settlements within the historical barony of Kenry include:

- Ballysteen
- Kildimo
- Pallaskenry
