= Garinish Island =

Garinish Island (Garinis in Irish, meaning 'The near island') can refer to:

- Garinish Island (County Cork) - island in County Cork
- Garinish Island (County Kerry) - island and townland in County Kerry
