= Edwin Wyndham-Quin, 3rd Earl of Dunraven and Mount-Earl =

Irish peer, Member of Parliament, and archaeologist (1812-1871)

The Right Honourable The Earl of Dunraven KP PC FRAI FSA FRGS FRS
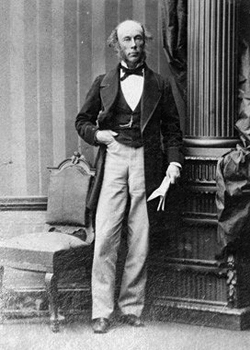
- 3rd Earl of Dunraven and Mount-Earl, 1861

Member of Parliament for Glamorganshire
- In office 1837–1851
- Preceded by: Lewis Weston Dillwyn
- Succeeded by: George Tyler

Member of the House of Lords
- Lord Temporal
- Baron Kenry; 11 June 1866 – 6 October 1871
- Preceded by: none; title established
- Succeeded by: Windham Wyndham-Quin, 4th Earl

Personal details
- Born: 19 May 1812 London, England
- Died: 6 October 1871 (aged 59)
- Party: Conservative
- Spouse(s): Augusta Gould (m. 1836; died 1866) Anne Lambert (m. 1870)
- Education: Trinity College Dublin

Edwin Richard Wyndham-Quin, 3rd Earl of Dunraven and Mount-Earl, KP, PC, FRAI, FSA, FRGS, FRS (19 May 1812 – 6 October 1871), styled Viscount Adare from 1824 to 1850, was an Irish peer, Conservative Member of Parliament, and archaeologist.

The son of the 2nd Earl of Dunraven and Mount-Earl, he succeeded to the Earldom on the death of his father in August 1850. Along with George Petrie, Lord Dunraven is credited with "laying the foundations of a sound school of archaeology" in Ireland.

== Family ==
Born on 19 May 1812, in Westminster, Dunraven was the eldest son of Windham Henry Quin (1782–1850), later the second earl, and of Caroline Wyndham, the daughter and heiress of Thomas Wyndham of Dunraven Castle, Glamorganshire. From her father she inherited the Wyndham estate in Glamorganshire and also property in Gloucestershire.

Dunraven's grandfather, Valentine Richard Quin (1752–1824), a staunch supporter of the union of Britain and Ireland, had been recommended by Lord Cornwallis for a peerage, and was created Baron Adare, of Adare, County Limerick, on 31 July 1800. He was further created Viscount Mount-Earl in 1816 and Earl of Dunraven in 1822.

In 1815, Dunraven's father, Windham Henry Quin, assumed the additional name of Wyndham in right of his wife. He represented County Limerick in the Westminster parliament from 1806 to 1820.

Wyndham-Quin was educated at Eton and at Trinity College Dublin, graduating BA in 1833. In 1824, when his father inherited the earldom, he gained the courtesy title of Viscount Adare.

His father was elected as an Irish representative peer and sat in the House of Lords from 1839 till his death in 1850.

He converted to Roman Catholicism in 1855.

== Parliamentary and public service ==
As Viscount Adare, Dunraven sat as the Conservative MP for Glamorganshire from the 1837 General Election to 1851. While in the House of Commons he became a Roman Catholic and his political activity largely aimed at safeguarding religious education in Ireland.

He subsequently became one of the commissioners of education in Ireland. In 1850, he succeeded his father as Earl of Dunraven and Mount-Earl in the peerage of Ireland and retired from the House of Commons the next year. In 1852, he joined James Henthorn Todd on the Brehon Law Commission which set about translating the Senchus Érenn, a collection of early Irish laws.

On 12 March 1866, he was named a knight of the Order of Saint Patrick, and, on 11 June of the same year, he was created a peer of the United Kingdom, with the title of Baron Kenry, of Kenry in the County Limerick, giving him a seat in the House of Lords. He was lord lieutenant of County Limerick from 1864 until his death.

== Academic pursuits ==
Dunraven was deeply interested in intellectual pursuits. For three years he studied astronomy under William Rowan Hamilton in the Dublin observatory, and acquired a thorough knowledge both of the practical and theoretical sides of the science. He investigated the phenomena of spiritualism, and convinced himself of their genuineness. His son, later, the fourth earl, prepared for him minute reports of séances which Daniel Dunglas Home conducted with his aid in 1867–8. The reports were privately printed as Experiences in Spiritualism with Mr. D. D. Home, with a lucid introduction by Dunraven, in 1869 and subsequently withdrawn.

Dunraven's chief interest was in archaeology. He was associated with George Petrie, Stokes, and other Irish archæologists in the foundation of the Irish Archaeological Society in 1840, and of the Celtic Society in 1845. In 1849 and 1869 he presided over the meetings of the Cambrian Archaeological Association held at Cardiff and Bridgend, and in 1871 was president of a section of the Royal Archæological Institute. In 1862 he accompanied Montalembert on a tour in Scotland, and five years later travelled in France and Italy, with the view of making a special study of campaniles. But Irish archæology mainly occupied him. He is said to have visited every barony in Ireland, and nearly every island off the coast. He was usually attended by a photographer, and Dr. William Stokes and Miss Margaret Stokes were often in his company.

After Petrie's death in 1866, Dunraven took it upon himself to complete his book, Notes on Irish Architecture. He spent four years travelling and working on this; two lengthy folios were published after his death, under the editorship of Margaret Stokes, with a preface by the fourth Earl of Dunraven, and notes by Petrie and Reeves. The work was illustrated by 161 wood engravings, from drawings by G. Petrie, W. F. Wakeman, Gordon Hills, Margaret Stokes, Lord Dunraven, and others, besides 125 fine plates. The first part dealt with stone buildings with and without cement, and the second part with belfries and Irish Romanesque.

His mother died in 1870. As an appendix to her book Memorials of Adare Manor, Dunraven compiled a minute and exhaustive treatise on the architectural remains in the neighbourhood of Adare. Part of this, dealing with the round tower and church of Dysart, was reprinted in the second volume of the 'Notes'. At the expense of Dunraven, many of these half-ruined buildings were restored and made available for religious purposes. He also contributed valuable papers to the Royal Irish Academy.

Dunraven was elected a Fellow of the Royal Archaeological Institute in 1831, a Fellow of the Royal Society in 1834, a Fellow of the Society of Arts in 1836, and a Fellow of the Royal Geographical Society in 1837.

Montalembert dedicated to him a volume of his Monks of the West.

Dunraven died at the Imperial Hotel, Great Malvern, on 6 October 1871, and was buried at Adare on 14 October.

He was a devout Roman Catholic, and a renowned landlord.

== Marriage ==
He married on 18 August 1836, Augusta Charlotte Goold (died 1866), the third daughter of Thomas Goold, Esq., of Rossbrien, Dromadda and Athea, a Master in the Court of Chancery (Ireland) and his wife Elizabeth Nixon. They were distant cousins, as Thomas's mother was an aunt of the first Earl. They had at least eight children, two sons being stillborn. His first wife died in 1866.

The surviving issue of this marriage were:

- Windham Wyndham-Quin, 4th Earl of Dunraven and Mount-Earl (1841–1926)
- Lady Caroline Adelaide Wyndham-Quin (15 May 1838 – 2 July 1853)
- Lady Augusta Emily Wyndham-Quin (10 August 1839 – 11 February 1877), married Sir Arthur Pendarves Vivian and had issue
- Lady Mary Frances Wyndham-Quin (25 November 1844 – 21 September 1884), married Arthur Smith-Barry, 1st Baron Barrymore and had issue
- Lady Edith Wyndham-Quin (7 September 1848 – 1885)
- Lady Emily Anna Wyndham-Quin (21 January 1848 – 1940)

Secondly, 27 January 1870, to Anne, daughter of Henry Lambert, esq., of Carnagh, Wexford, who, after his death, married Hedworth Jolliffe, 2nd Baron Hylton.

A portrait of his first wife, who died on 22 November 1866, was painted by Hayter, and engraved by Holl. Their son, the fourth earl, under-secretary for the colonies in 1885–1886 and again in 1886–1887, became an active Irish politician and yachtsman.

There are portraits at Adare Manor of the first Earl of Dunraven by Batoni, and of the third earl and countess by T. Philipps, as well as busts of the first and second earls.

In 1855, Dunraven purchased "Garinish Island" near Sneem (County Kerry, Ireland) as a holiday retreat from the Bland family of Derryquin Castle. He commissioned the architect James Franklin Fuller (1835–1924) and the building contractor Denis William Murphy (1799–1863, father of William Martin Murphy) with the creation of a house, later called "Garinish Lodge", and a garden on the island. His son, the 4th Earl of Dunraven and Mount-Earl, developed the garden from 1900 onward into a subtropical wild garden, which is still in existence.

== Works ==
- Wyndham-Quin, Edwin (1875), Stokes, Margaret (ed.), Notes on Irish Architecture, vol. 1, George Bell and Sons
- Wyndham-Quin, Edwin (1877), Stokes, Margaret (ed.), Notes on Irish Architecture, vol. 2, George Bell and Sons
- Wyndham-Quin, Caroline; Wyndham-Quin, Edwin (1865), Memorials of Adare Manor by Caroline Countess of Dunraven with Historical Notices of Adare by her son the Earl of Dunraven, Messrs. Parker : Oxford
- Earl of Dunraven (1873), "On an Ancient Chalice and Brooches Lately Found at Ardagh, in the County of Limerick", The Transactions of the Royal Irish Academy, 24 Antiquities, Royal Irish Academy: 433–455, JSTOR 30079267

Parliament of the United Kingdom
Preceded by Christopher Rice Mansel Talbot; Lewis Weston Dillwyn	Member of Parliament for Glamorganshire; 1837–1851; With: Christopher Rice Mansel Talbot	Succeeded by Christopher Rice Mansel Talbot; Sir George Tyler
Honorary titles
Preceded by The Earl of Clare	Lord Lieutenant of Limerick; 1864–1871	Succeeded by William Monsell
Peerage of Ireland
Preceded by Windham Henry Quin	Earl of Dunraven and Mount-Earl; 1850–1871	Succeeded by Windham Thomas Wyndham-Quin
Peerage of the United Kingdom
New creation	Baron Kenry; 1866–1871	Succeeded by Windham Wyndham-Quin
