= Windham Wyndham-Quin, 5th Earl of Dunraven and Mount-Earl =

Irish politician (1857-1952)

Colonel The Right Honourable The Earl of Dunraven CB DSO DL
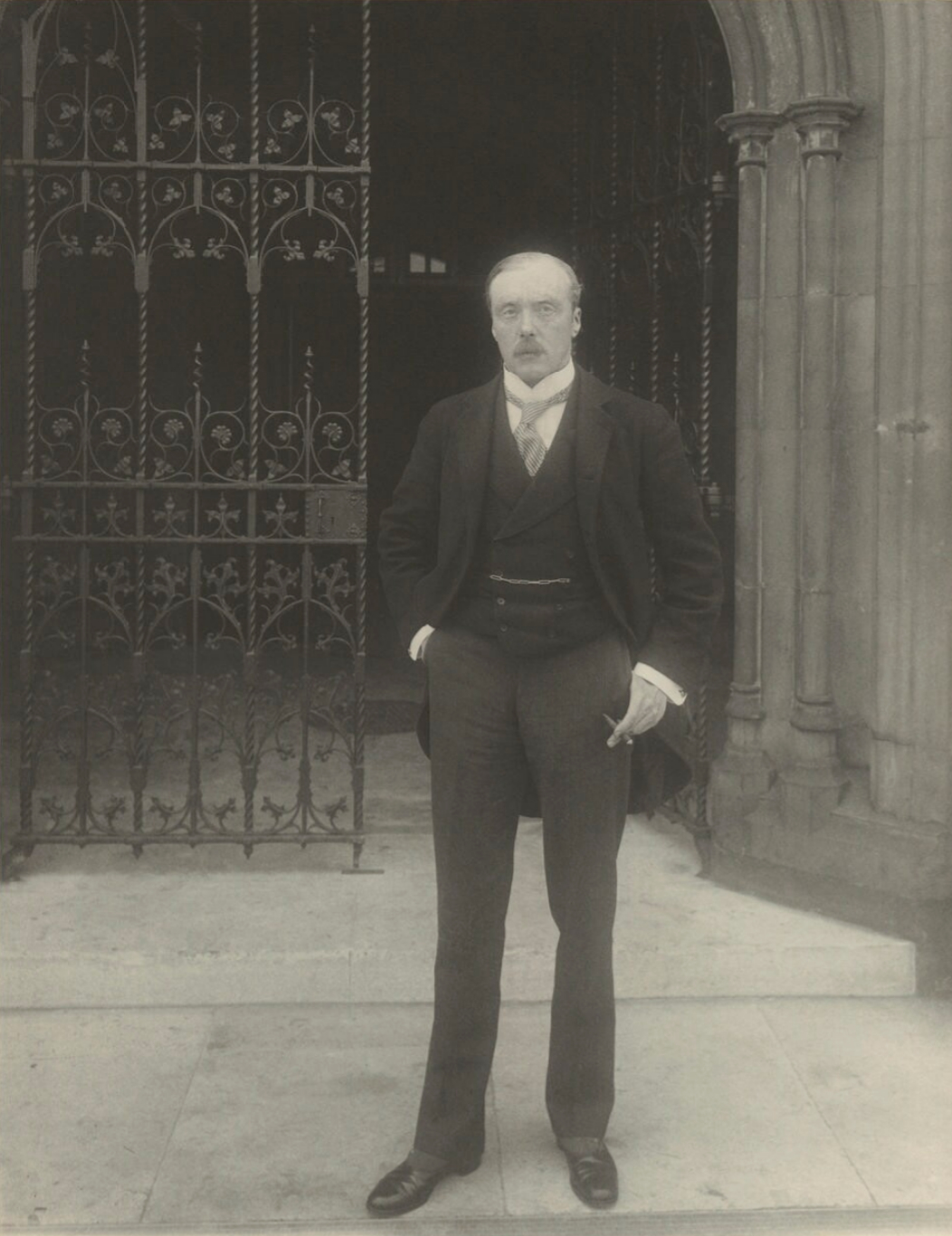
- 5th Earl of Dunraven

Member of Parliament for South Glamorganshire
- In office 1895–1906
- Preceded by: Arthur John Williams
- Succeeded by: William Brace

High Sheriff of County Kilkenny
- In office 1914–1917
- Preceded by: Walter Charles Lindsay
- Succeeded by: Godfrey Herbert Bloomfield

Personal details
- Born: 7 February 1857
- Died: 23 October 1952 (aged 95); Adare Manor, County Limerick, Ireland
- Resting place: St. Nicholas' Church of Ireland, Adare, Ireland
- Political party: Conservative
- Spouse: Lady Eva Constance Aline Bourke (m. 1885)
- Children: 4, including Richard Wyndham-Quin, 6th Earl of Dunraven and Hon. Valentine Wyndham-Quin

Colonel Windham Henry Wyndham-Quin, 5th Earl of Dunraven, CB, DSO, DL (7 February 1857 – 23 October 1952) was an Irish peer, British Army officer and a Conservative Member of Parliament for South Glamorganshire (1895–1906).

== Background ==
Memorial plaque

He was the son of Captain Hon. Windham Henry Wyndham-Quin (1829–1865), second son of Windham Quin, 2nd Earl of Dunraven, by his wife Caroline Tyler, daughter of Rear-Admiral Sir George Tyler. He succeeded to the Earldom on the death of his first cousin Windham Wyndham-Quin, 4th Earl of Dunraven, who died in 1926 without male issue.

== Military and political career ==
Wyndham-Quin was a major in the 16th Lancers, and served in the First Boer War in 1881. He was aide-de-camp (ADC) and military secretary to the Governor of Madras, Lord Connemara, between 1886 and 1889.

He again volunteered for service in South Africa in early 1900, during the Second Boer War, and was appointed a captain in the Imperial Yeomanry on 14 February 1900. He raised and commanded the 4th (Glamorgan) Company, IY, which left Liverpool on the SS Cymric in March 1900 to serve as a company of the 1st Battalion Imperial Yeomanry. On 18 April 1900 he was appointed 2nd in command of this battalion. He was mentioned in despatches, received the Queen's medal (3 clasps), and was awarded the Distinguished Service Order (DSO) in November 1900. On return from South Africa he raised and commanded the Glamorgan Imperial Yeomanry, a full regiment that perpetuated 4th Company. He was promoted to the honorary rank of colonel on 19 Oct 1901.

In the 1895 general election he was elected Member of Parliament for South Glamorganshire, winning the seat for the Conservative Party. He was re-elected in 1900, but lost the seat in the 1906 general election.

He served as High Sheriff of County Kilkenny for 1914.

== Family ==
Dunraven married Lady Eva Constance Aline Bourke (1858–1940), daughter of Richard Southwell Bourke, 6th Earl of Mayo, Viceroy of India, and Hon. Blanche Wyndham, daughter of the 1st Baron Leconfield. They had the following children:

- Richard Southwell Windham Robert Wyndham-Quin, 6th Earl of Dunraven (1887–1965)
- Captain Hon. Valentine Maurice Wyndham-Quin, RN (1890–1983), married Marjorie Pretyman and had three daughters, including Marjorie, wife of the 6th Marquess of Salisbury, and Pamela, wife of the 6th Baron Leconfield
- Lady Olein Eva Constance Wyndham-Quin (1892–1969)

He died at Adare Manor and is buried at St. Nicholas' Church of Ireland in Adare, County Limerick, Ireland.

== Publications ==
- The Yeomanry Cavalry of Gloucester and Monmouth (1897)
- Sir Charles Tyler, GCB, Admiral of the White (1912)
- The Foxhound in County Limerick

Parliament of the United Kingdom
Preceded by Arthur John Williams	Member of Parliament for South Glamorganshire; 1895–1906	Succeeded by William Brace
Peerage of Ireland
Preceded by Windham Wyndham-Quin	Earl of Dunraven and Mount-Earl; 1926–1952	Succeeded by Richard Wyndham-Quin
