= Valentine Quin, 1st Earl of Dunraven and Mount-Earl =

Irish Peer and MP

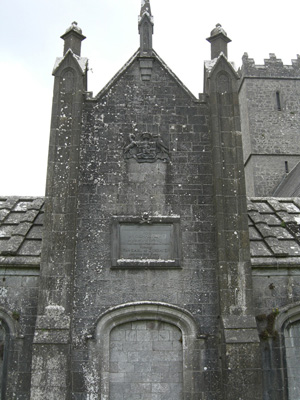

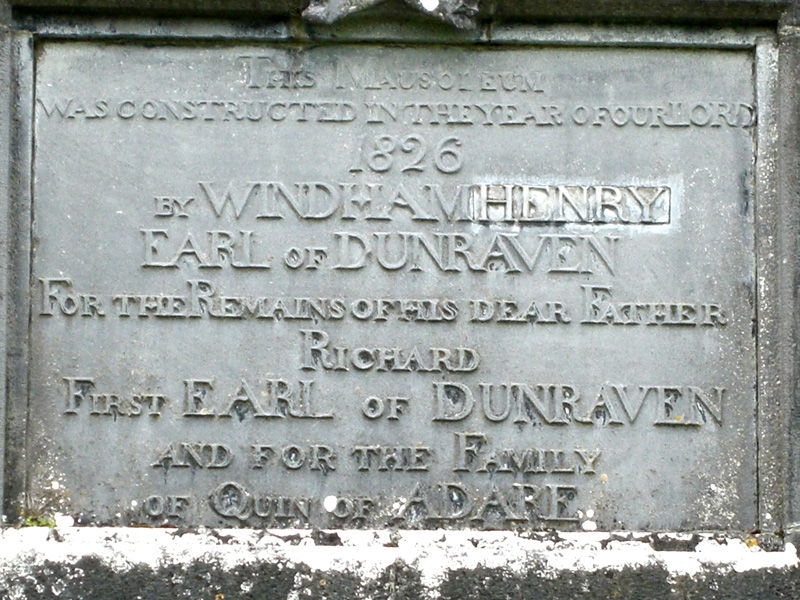

Valentine Richard Quin, 1st Earl of Dunraven and Mount-Earl (30 July 1752 – 24 August 1824), styled Sir Valentine Quin, Bt. from 1781 to 1800, was an Irish peer and politician.

== Biography ==
He was the son of Windham Quin, Esq. of Adare, and Frances Dawson, daughter of Richard Dawson, of Dawon's Grove, County Monaghan. His grandfather had added to the family's wealth and estates by marriage to the heiress Mary Widenham of Kildimo.

He was created a Baronet in 1781. He was elected to the Irish House of Commons in 1799 as a Member of Parliament for his father's old seat, Kilmallock. He took hos oath on 15 January 1800, sitting until the union of Ireland and Great Britain in 1800/01.

He was created Baron Adare on 31 July 1800 – as a staunch supporter of the political union, he was recommended by Lord Cornwallis – Viscount Mount-Earl on 3 February 1816, and Earl of Dunraven and Mount-Earl on 5 February 1822, all titles in the Peerage of Ireland. He presumably chose the title of Dunraven in honour of his daughter-in-law, the heiress Caroline Wyndham of Dunraven Castle, who had married his eldest son in 1810. His earldom lasted only two years until his death in 1824, when his son, Windham Henry Quin, became the 2nd Earl of Dunraven and Mount-Earl. The family name had officially become Wyndham-Quin in 1815.

=== Marriage and children ===
He married firstly Lady Frances Muriel Fox-Strangways, daughter of Stephen Fox-Strangways, 1st Earl of Ilchester, and his wife, the former Elizabeth Horner, on 24 August 1777. They had the following children:

- Lady Harriet Quin (d. 13 December 1845), married Sir William Payne-Gallwey, 1st Baronet
- Windham Henry Quin, 2nd Earl of Dunraven (1782–1850)

He married secondly Margaret Mary Coghlan in 1816.

He is buried at St. Nicholas' Church of Ireland in Adare, County Limerick, Ireland.

Parliament of Ireland
Preceded by Charles Silver Oliver; Silver Oliver	Member of Parliament for County Westmeath; 1800; With: Thomas Casey	Constituency disenfranchised
Peerage of Ireland
New creation	Earl of Dunraven and Mount-Earl; 1822–1824	Succeeded by Windham Quin
New creation	Viscount Mount-Earl; 1816–1824	Succeeded by Windham Quin
New creation	Baron Adare; 1800–1824	Succeeded by Windham Quin
Baronetage of Ireland
New creation	Baronet (of Adare); 1781–1824	Succeeded by Windham Quin
