= Adare Friary =

Monastery in County Limerick, Ireland

Coordinates: 52.567839°N 8.784765°W

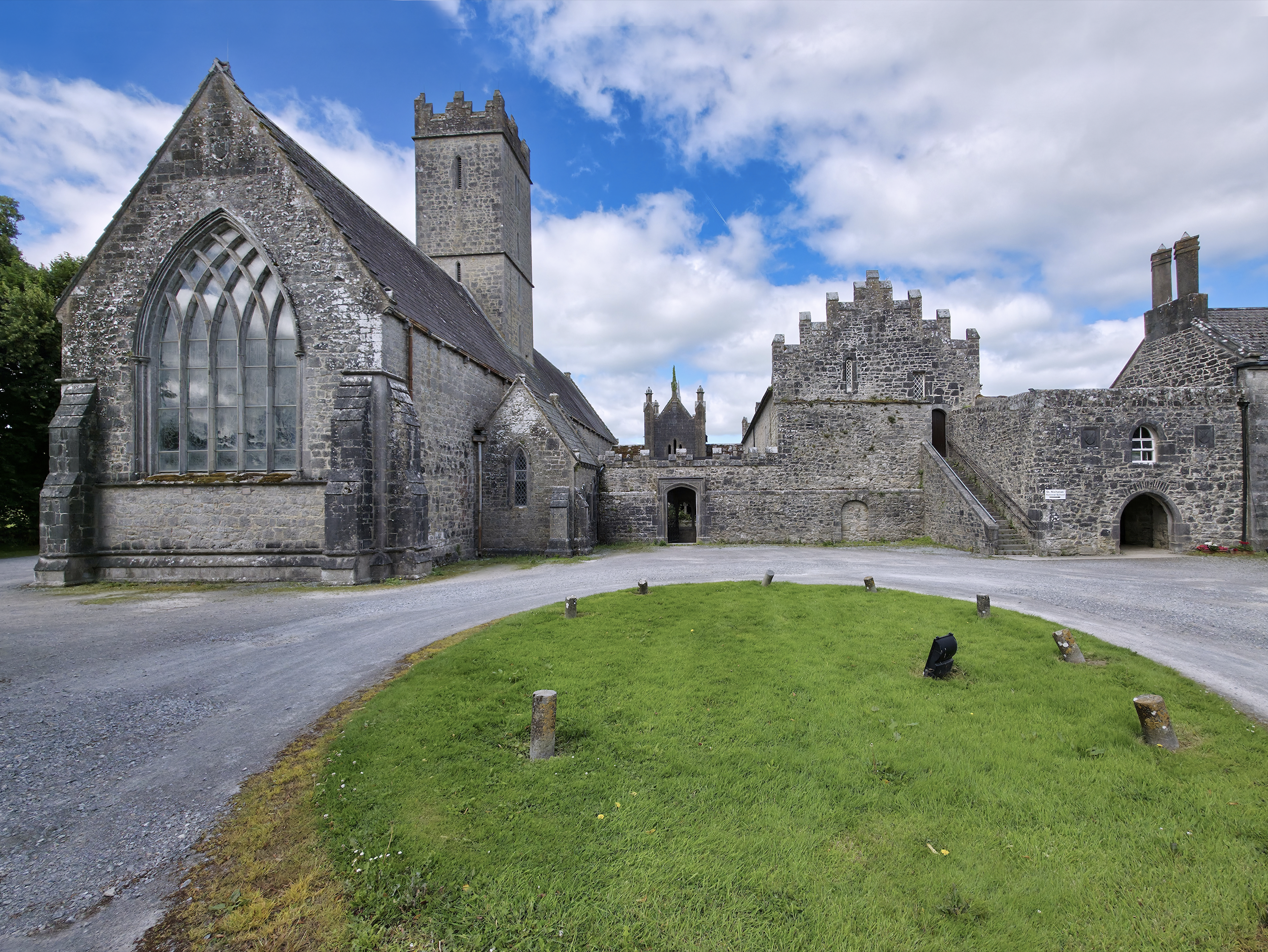
- Interactive map of Adare Friary

Monastery information
- Other name: Black Abbey
- Order: Order of Saint Augustine
- Denomination: Church of Ireland
- Established: 1316
- Dedication: St Nicholas
- Controlled churches: St Nicholas' Church

Architecture
- Status: Active
- Heritage designation: National Monument of Ireland
- Designated date: 2008
- Style: Gothic
- Groundbreaking: c.1300
- Completed date: c.1870

Site
- Location: Adare, County Limerick
- Country: Ireland
- Public access: yes

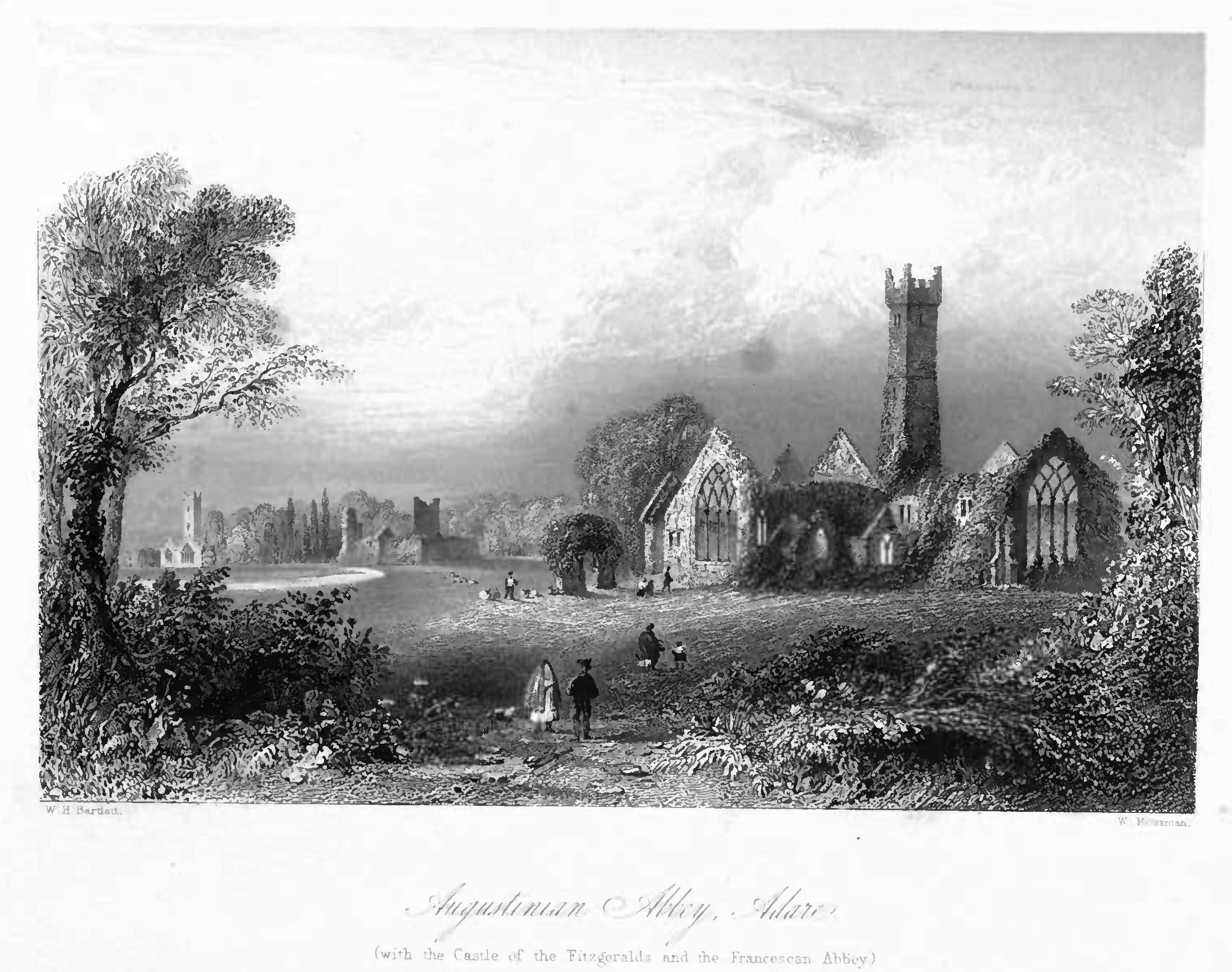
"Augustinian Abbey, Adare (with the castle of the Fitzgeralds and the Francescan Abbey)", 1842

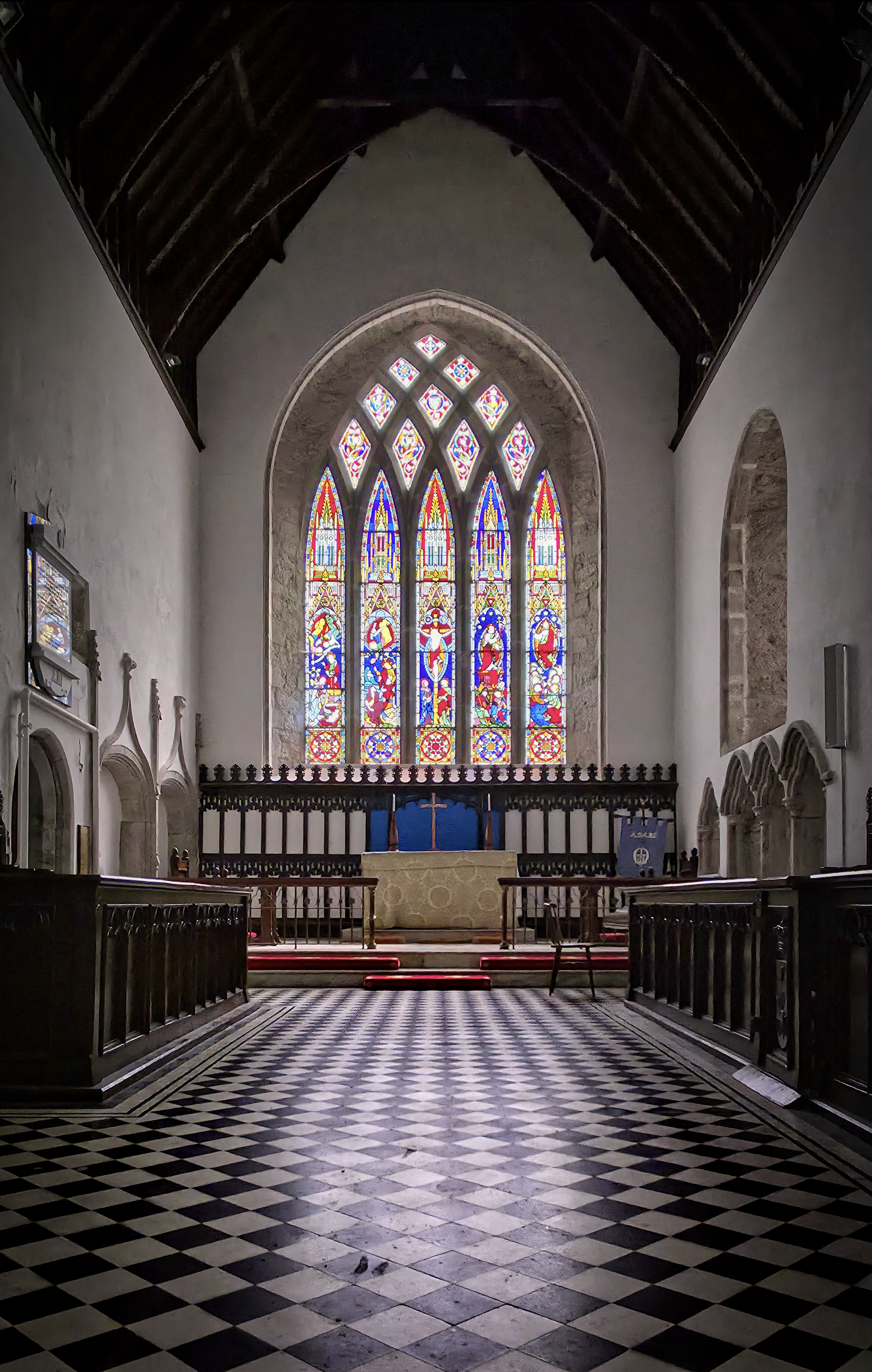
Adare Friary Chancel

The Adare Friary, located in Adare, County Limerick, Ireland, formerly known as the "Black Abbey", is an Augustinian Friary founded in 1316 by the Earl of Kildare. It is now known as "St. Nicholas' Church of Ireland" parish church, and St Nicholas' National School. It is a nationally ranked building in the NIAH register.

== History ==
The Augustinian friars first came to Dublin from England in about 1260. They were invited to Adare by John FitzThomas FitzGerald, 1st Earl of Kildare in 1316 and given land and houses in the town.

By 1541 the Augustinian friars owned nearly 80 acres (320,000 m^{2}) of land, several cottages and gardens in the village and a fishing weir on the river. As part of the Tudor suppression of Irish Monasteries at the end of the 16th century, the Augustinians were driven out of Adare and had moved to Limerick city by 1633.

Many of the features of the friary are very well preserved, particularly the small 15th-century cloister and sedilia. The garth is small and square, and the piers are relatively narrow and buttress-like, with boldly moulded plinths repeated along the base walls. The arches between them are relatively high and four-centred and the triple openings are set centrally in the walls, with unglazed mullioned windows. Their heads are round and cinque-cusped. All the ambulatories have rather flat vaulting, groined on the north and west, three-centred to the other walks. The relative elaboration is thanks to the Geraldine patronage which explains the Geraldine Arms carved on the inner spandrels of the east arcade.

The interior of the church must have originally been coloured with medieval murals of red and yellow with black lining.

The Pietà is a beautifully sensitive piece of wood carving believed to be 16th-century Flemish.

The massive oak door from the choir to the vestry is an ancient one which was removed from the old parish church of St. Nicholas.

The string course below the parapet on the south side aisle consists of late stone bosses including a Tudor rose.

The Dunraven family continued restoration work on the friary through the 19th century.

== Modern uses ==
=== Church ===
The church is now used by the Church of Ireland to serve the region of Adare. It is a part of the wider Adare union of parishes, which also includes Croom, Kilpeacon and Kilmallock. The church is also home to two pieces of Robert (Mouseman) Thompson furniture. His signature of a carved mouse can be found on the base of a lectern and on one of the uprights of a railing.

=== School ===
St Nicholas' National School was established by the Earl of Dunraven in 1814, becoming a national school in 1862. It is a co-educational primary school with a Church of Ireland ethos.

The school was originally housed in the refectory of the friary. In early 2007, construction began on a new school building behind the original monastery. The building has three classrooms and has sedum growing on its roof. The old school had two classrooms divided by a partition wall. Construction was completed in August 2008, with teachers and pupils moving into the new school in September, at the start of the new school year. On 12 December 2008, the building was officially opened by Mary Hanafin TD, who was the Minister for Education and Science when construction started. The old building is now used for PE and drama classes.

== Burials ==
- Windham Wyndham-Quin, 5th Earl of Dunraven and Mount-Earl
- Windham Wyndham-Quin, 4th Earl of Dunraven and Mount-Earl
- Valentine Quin, 1st Earl of Dunraven and Mount-Earl
- John FitzGerald, 1st Earl of Kildare
- Thomas FitzGerald, 2nd Earl of Kildare

== See also ==
- List of abbeys and priories in Ireland (County Limerick)
