= Richard Wyndham-Quin, 6th Earl of Dunraven and Mount-Earl =

Irish peer

Richard Southwell Windham Robert Wyndham-Quin, 6th Earl of Dunraven, CB, CBE, MC (18 May 1887 – 28 August 1965), styled Viscount Adare between 1926 and 1952, was an Irish peer.

== Biography ==
The son of Windham Wyndham-Quin, 5th Earl of Dunraven, he succeeded to the Earldom in 1952 on the death of his father. Dunraven fought in World War I where he was wounded and mentioned in despatches. He gained the rank of Captain in the 12th Royal Lancers and was awarded the Military Cross (MC).

Dunraven was appointed Commander of the Order of the British Empire (CBE) in 1921 and Companion of the Order of the Bath (CB) in 1923.

== Marriages and children ==
Lord Dunraven married firstly Helen Lindsay Swire on 20 October 1915. They had no children and were divorced in 1932.

Dunraven married secondly Nancy Yuille (1902–1994), an American socialite, on 7 March 1934. They had three children:

- Lady Melissa Eva Caroline Wyndham-Quin (16 February 1935 – 5 January 2021), married Sir George Brooke, 3rd Baronet, on 25 June 1959 and has issue.
- Lady Caroline Olein Geraldine Wyndham-Quin (born 14 September 1936), married John Beresford, 8th Marquess of Waterford, on 23 July 1957 and has issue, including Henry Beresford, 9th Marquess of Waterford.
- Thady Windham Thomas Wyndham-Quin, 7th (and last) Earl of Dunraven (27 October 1939 – 25 March 2011)

Peerage of Ireland
Preceded by Windham Wyndham-Quin	Earl of Dunraven; 1952–1965	Succeeded by Thady Wyndham-Quin
