= Frederick Goold =

19th century Anglican priest in Ireland

Frederick Falkiner Goold (May 1808 – 1877) was a 19th century Anglican priest in Ireland.

Goold was born in County Limerick on 6 November 1808. He was the youngest son of Thomas Goold, First Serjeant-at-law (Ireland) and Master in the Court of Chancery (Ireland) and Elizabeth Nixon. He was educated at Trinity College, Dublin, He was appointed Archdeacon of Raphoe on 13 December 1852; and Private Chaplain to the Lord Lieutenant of Ireland in 1858. He died at Bath, Somerset on 29 January 1877.

He married Caroline Newcomen, one of the many natural children of Thomas Gleadowe-Newcomen, 2nd Viscount Newcomen, and had six children. His son was an MP; and his son-in-law a bishop.

== Arms ==
Coat of arms of Frederick Goold

Notes
Confirmed 19 May 1858 by Sir John Bernard Burke, Ulster King of Arms.
Crest
A demi-lion rampant Or charged on the shoulder with a crescent Gules.
Escutcheon
Azure on a fess Or between five Goldfinches three in chief and two in base Proper three mullets of the field in the centre chief point a crescent of the second for difference.
Motto
Deus Mihi Providebit
