= Kildimo =

Village in County Limerick, Ireland

Kildimo Cill Díoma
- Village
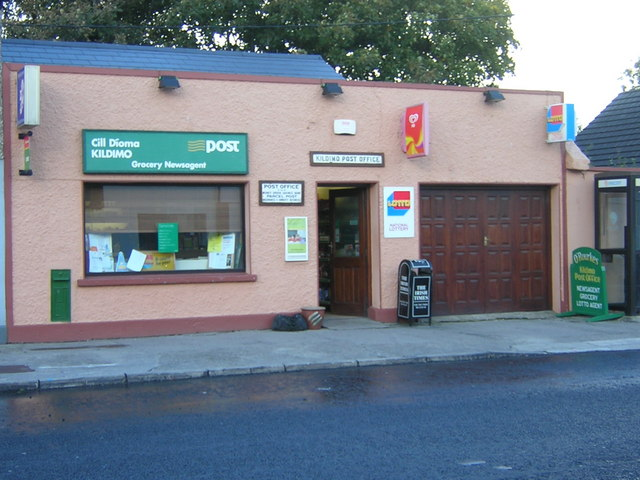
- Kildimo "Peggy's" Post Office

- Location in Ireland
- Coordinates: 52°37′03″N 08°48′34″W
- Country: Ireland
- Province: Munster
- County: County Limerick

Population (2016)
  - Total: 417
- Time zone: UTC+0 (WET)
  - Summer (DST): UTC-1 (IST (WEST))

Kildimo (Irish: Cill Díoma) is a village in County Limerick, Ireland. The village is close to the Shannon estuary, 13 km west of Limerick city, on the N69 road. The population was 417 at the 2016 census.

== Kildimo/Pallaskenry Parish ==
The parish of Kildimo/Pallaskenry is in the barony of Kenry. The present-day parish is made up of what were once the parishes of Kildimo, Ardcanny and Chapelrussell. Chapelrussell parish was once called Killuragh, Killenalotar or Killulta.

The name Kildimo comes from the Irish Cill Díoma, meaning the church of St Díoma. The old people of the parish used to pronounce the name 'Kildeema'. According to Mainchín Seoige, St Díoma is said to have flourished in the second half of the 5th century. He was reputedly of royal stock, the son of Cas, king of Munster, and an uncle of St Munchin, patron of the diocese of Limerick. His feast day is 12 May.

Pallaskenry comes from the Irish Pailís Chaonraí meaning 'The Palisaded Fortress of Kenry'. The Caonraighe were a Gaelic Irish tribe who occupied this part of Limerick in the remote past, who gave their name to the barony of Kenry.

== History ==
Kildimo village was once centred on the area now known as Old Kildimo, about a mile south of the present-day village. However, with the construction of what is now the N69 from Limerick to Tralee the present-day village, known as New Kildimo, began to rise up. New Kildimo used to be called 'The Line' after the road on which it grew.

In the seventeenth century, the Widenham family were the principal landowners in Kildimo. In the eighteenth century their estates passed by inheritance to the Hartstonge Baronets, and ultimately to the Pery family who acquired the title Earl of Limerick.

There are several castles in the area, including Cullam castle, Ballyculhane Castle and Dromore Castle. Dromore Castle is unusual in that it was built late in the 19th century by the Earl of Limerick in the style of a fairytale castle.

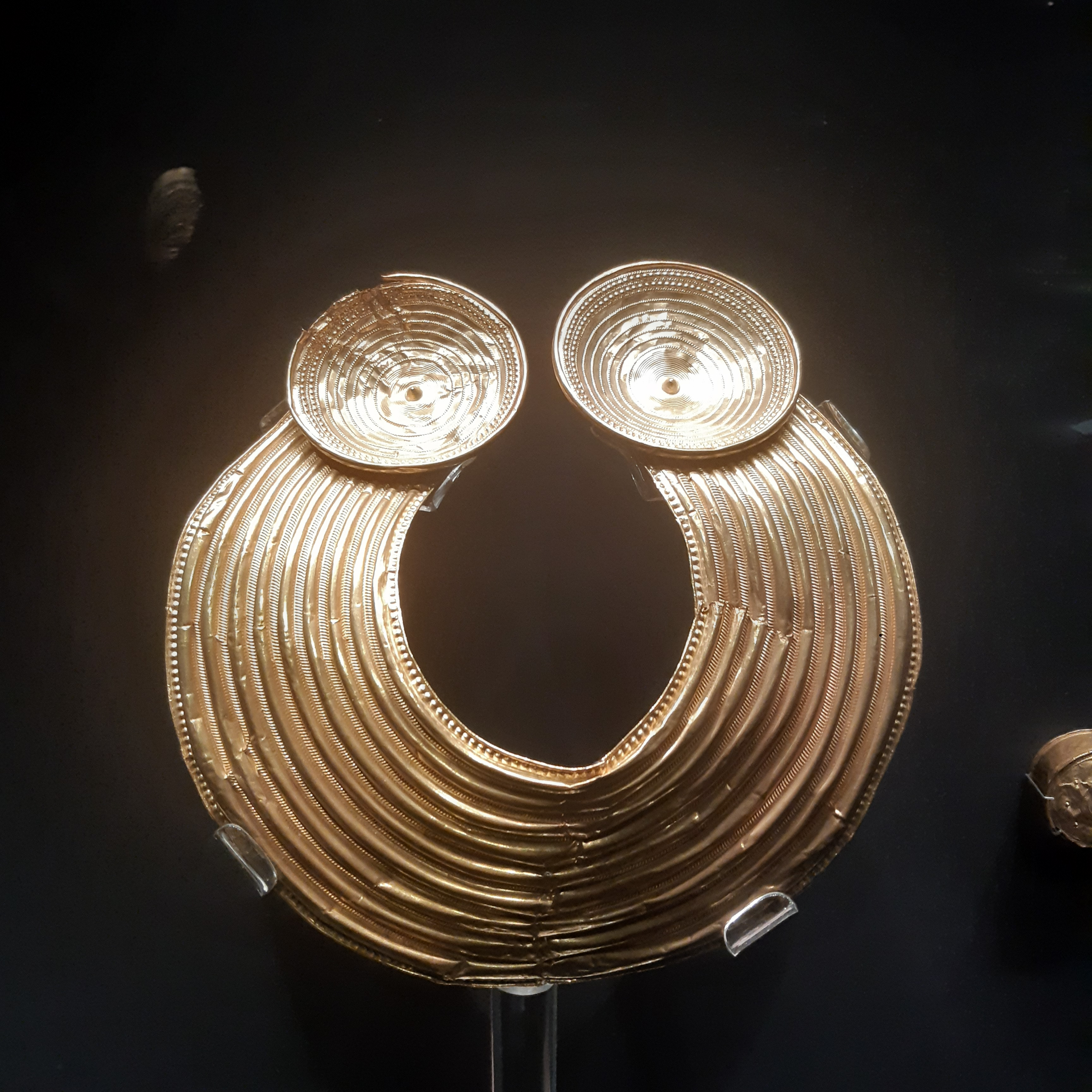
Shannongrove Collar in the Victoria and Albert Museum

There have been a few interesting finds in the area, including the Shannongrove Collar which was found at a depth of 12 feet in a bog on lands granted to Phineas Bury during Cromwellian plantations. A bone crucifix was found around the 1950s at Dog's Island, the boggy ground between Dromore Lake and a very small lake east of it.

In 1922 the Salesians of Don Bosco bought land from George Caulefield and set up an agricultural college. Along with the agricultural college, there is also a secondary school in the college. In old Kildimo there is a primary school.

== See also ==
- List of towns and villages in Ireland
