= Garinish Island (County Kerry) =

Island in County Kerry, Ireland

Native name: Garinis
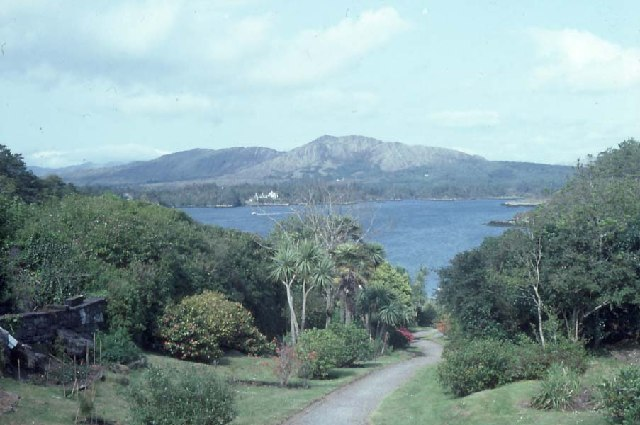
- View from Garinish Island in August 1986. Knockanamadane mountain in the distance

- Location within island of Ireland

Geography
- Location: Kenmare River
- Coordinates: 51°48′17″N 09°53′57″W
- Area: 57 acres (23 ha)

Administration
- Ireland
- Province: Munster
- County: Kerry

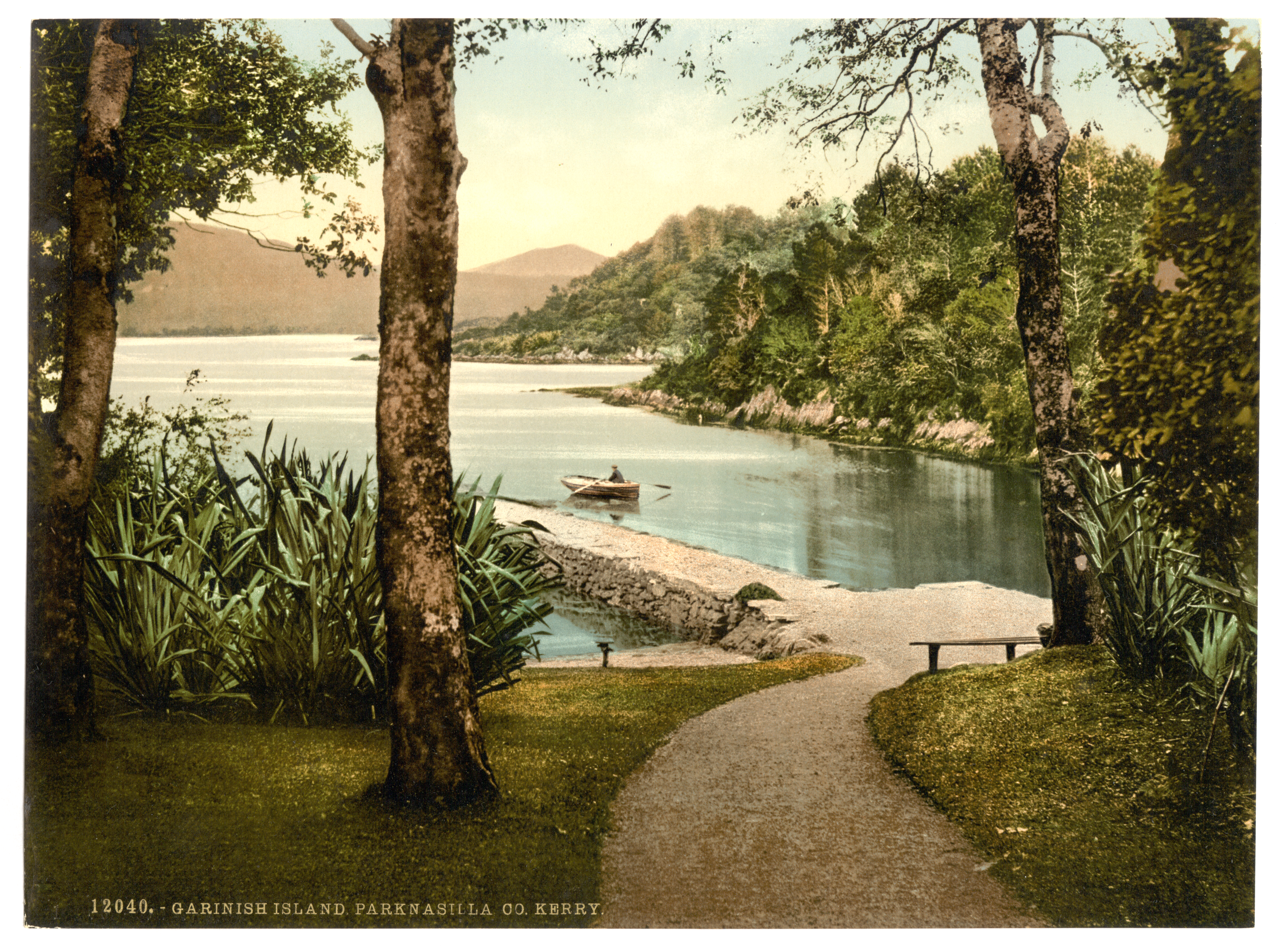
Print of Garinish Island Harbor (Parknasilla. County Kerry, Ireland) between 1890 and 1900

Garinish (Garinis in Irish, meaning 'near island') is a privately owned island lying off the coast of the Iveragh Peninsula, County Kerry, Ireland.

== History ==
In 1855 Edwin Edwin Wyndham-Quin, 3rd Earl of Dunraven and Mount-Earl (1812-1871), purchased Garinish Island as a holiday retreat from the Bland family of Derryquin Castle. He commissioned the architect James Franklin Fuller (1835-1924) and the building contractor Denis William Murphy (1799-1863, father of William Martin Murphy) with the creation of a house, later called "Garinish Lodge", and a garden on the island.

From 1900 onwards his son, Windham Wyndham-Quin, 4th Earl of Dunraven and Mount-Earl (1841-1926), developed the gardens on Garinish Island into a subtropical wild garden. It is still in existence today. The house, Garinish Lodge, was burned in September 1922 during the Irish Civil War (1922–1923), but later rebuilt. When Lord Dunraven died in June 1926, aged 85. he left Garinish Island to his only surviving child, Lady Aileen May Wyndham-Quin (1873–1962).

About 1950 Reginald Browne and his wife bought the island and restored the house and the garden after many years of neglect. Their sons continued with the replenishing of plants and trees.

Since the 1990s, the island has been owned by Jacqui Safra, a Swiss investor and a descendant of the Syrian Jewish Safra banking family.

== The garden ==
Garinish Island has a fine garden, renowned for tree ferns. Cordyline australis (cabbage trees) thrive in this region. They line the pathway in the photograph on the top left.
