= Earl of Dunraven and Mount-Earl =

Irish peerage title

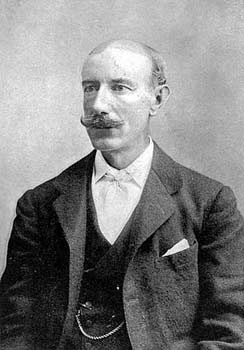
Windham Wyndham-Quin, 4th Earl of Dunraven and Mount-Earl

Earl of Dunraven and Mount-Earl (usually referred to as Earl of Dunraven) was a title in the Peerage of Ireland. It was created on 5 February 1822 for Valentine Quin, 1st Viscount Mount-Earl. Quin had already been created a Baronet, of Adare in County Limerick, in the Baronetage of Ireland, in 1781, Baron Adare, of Adare in the County of Limerick, on 31 July 1800, and Viscount Mount-Earl on 3 February 1816. The title (also spelled unhyphenated as Mount Earl) refers to Mount-earl, a big house east of Adare in the Monearla townland. He was made Viscount Adare in 1822 at the same time as he was given the earldom. The latter peerage titles were also in the Peerage of Ireland.

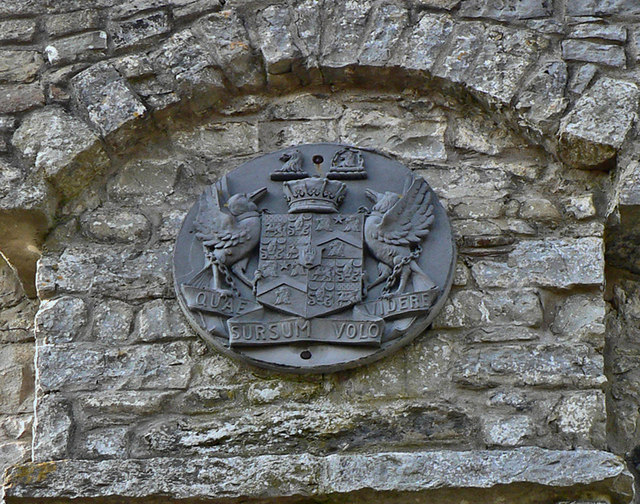
Arms at Dunraven Park

The title was in honour of the first earl's daughter-in-law, the heiress Caroline Wyndham of Dunraven Castle, who had married his eldest son Windham Henry Quin in 1810.

His son, the second Earl, represented County Limerick in the House of Commons from 1806 to 1820 and also sat in the House of Lords as an Irish representative peer from 1839 until his death in 1850. In 1815 the second Earl had assumed by Royal licence his wife's maiden surname of Wyndham in addition to that of Quin. His eldest son, the third Earl, sat as a Conservative Member of Parliament for Glamorganshire from 1836 to 1850 and also served as Lord Lieutenant of County Limerick from 1864 to 1871. In 1866, Dunraven was given the additional title of Baron Kenry, of Kenry in the County Limerick, in the Peerage of the United Kingdom.

He was succeeded by his son, the fourth Earl, who served in the Conservative government of Lord Salisbury as Under-Secretary of State for the Colonies from 1885 to 1886. A member of the Irish Unionist Party, he was also Lord Lieutenant of County Limerick from 1894 to 1926. When the Chief Secretary for Ireland, George Wyndham, called a Land Conference in 1902, Lord Dunraven was chairman representing the landlord side and together with William O'Brien played a decisive role in attaining agreement on the enactment of the Wyndham Land Purchase (Ireland) Act 1903 which enabled tenants to purchase lands from their landlords under favourable financial provisions. He was a Senator of the Irish Free State from 1922 to 1926. He had no male heirs and on his death the barony of Kenry became extinct. The Fourth Earl published his memoir Past Times and Pastimes in 1922 (Hodder and Stoughton). He was succeeded in the other titles by his cousin, the fifth Earl. He had previously represented South Glamorganshire in Parliament as a Conservative from 1895 to 1906. The titles became extinct when the seventh Earl died on 25 March 2011 at his residence, Kilgobbin House.

The family seat until the seventh Earl's death was Kilgobbin House, in Adare, Ireland. The former seat was the palatial Adare Manor in County Limerick. Adare Manor was sold by the Dunraven family in 1982 and is now a luxury hotel. The south Wales home of the Dunraven family, Dunraven House at Dunraven Bay, near Bridgend, no longer exists apart from the walled gardens and some floors and steps. Dunraven Castle, as it was often called, was demolished in 1963 after having been used as a guest house for some years. In the First and Second World Wars, the house served as a military hospital.

The Earl of Dunraven arrived at what would become Estes Park, Colorado in late December 1872, visited repeatedly, and decided to take over the valley for his own private hunting preserve. His land grab did not work, but he controlled 6,000 acres before he changed tactics and opened the area's first resort, the Estes Park Hotel, which was destroyed by fire in 1911.

== Earls of Dunraven and Mount-Earl (1822) ==
- Valentine Richard Quin, 1st Earl of Dunraven and Mount-Earl (1752–1824)
- Windham Henry Quin, 2nd Earl of Dunraven and Mount-Earl (1782–1850)
- Edwin Richard Wyndham-Quin, 3rd Earl of Dunraven and Mount-Earl (1812–1871)
- Windham Thomas Wyndham-Quin, 4th Earl of Dunraven and Mount-Earl (1841–1926)
- Windham Henry Wyndham-Quin, 5th Earl of Dunraven and Mount-Earl (1857–1952)
- Richard Southwell Windham Robert Wyndham-Quin, 6th Earl of Dunraven and Mount-Earl (1887–1965)
- Thady Windham Thomas Wyndham-Quin, 7th Earl of Dunraven and Mount-Earl (1939–2011)

== See also ==
- Dunraven School

Baronetage of Great Britain
Preceded by Mosley baronets	Quin baronets of Adare; 8 June 1781	Succeeded by Middleton baronets
