= George Tyler (Royal Navy officer) =

British naval officer and politician

Sir George Tyler KH (28 December 1792 – 4 June 1862) was a British Royal Navy officer from who became a colonial governor and then Conservative Party politician.

The son of Admiral Sir Charles Tyler, he joined the navy in 1809, rising to the rank of captain in 1822, rear admiral in 1852, and vice admiral in 1857.

Tyler was made a Knight of the Royal Guelphic Order in 1833, and knighted again in November 1838. From 1833 to 1840 he was Lieutenant Governor of the island of St Vincent in the Caribbean, which it became part of the British Windward Islands.

He was elected unopposed as one of the two Members of Parliament (MPs) for Glamorganshire at a by-election in 1851 following the resignation of Viscount Adare He was re-elected unopposed in 1852, and did not defend his seat at the 1857 general election.

In 1847, 1848, 1849, and 1850 he was one of the 3 people nominated for to be High Sheriff of Glamorgan for the following year, but was not appointed.

Tyler lived at a Cotterell, in Glamorgan, Wales. He died on 4 June 1862 in at Dunraven Castle, Glamorgan.

== See also ==
- O'Byrne, William Richard (1849). "Tyler, George" . A Naval Biographical Dictionary . John Murray – via Wikisource.

Government offices
New title	Lieutenant Governor of Saint Vincent; 1833–1842	Succeeded by Richard Doherty
Parliament of the United Kingdom
Preceded by Viscount Adare; Christopher Rice Mansel Talbot	Member of Parliament for Glamorganshire; 1851 – 1857; With: Christopher Rice Mansel Talbot	Succeeded by Sir Henry Hussey Vivian; Christopher Rice Mansel Talbot
