= Dunraven Castle =

Mansion near Southerndown, Wales

Coordinates: 51.4434°N 3.6018°W

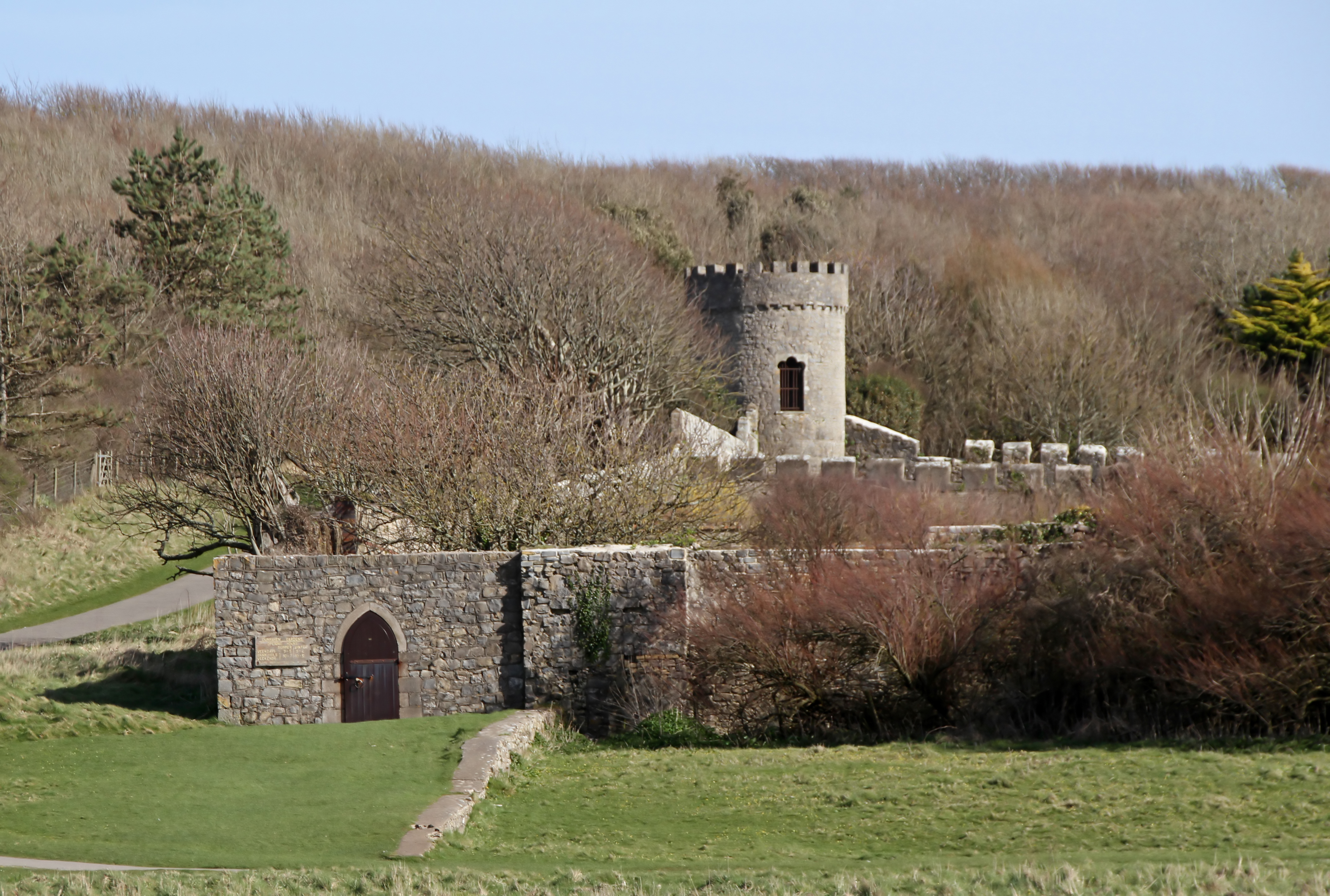
The walled gardens and tower above the salt cellar

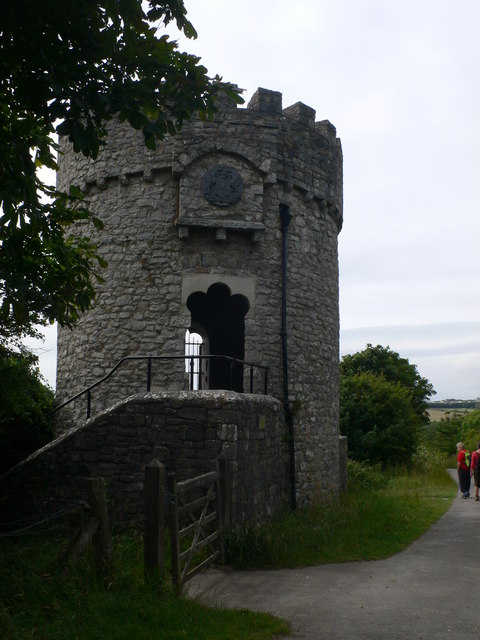
Ice Tower, Dunraven Castle

Dunraven Castle (Welsh: Castell Dwnrhefn) was a mansion on the South Wales coast near Southerndown. The existing manor house was rebuilt as a castellated hunting lodge in the early 19th century and was extensively remodelled later in the century. The surviving parts of the house are a Grade II listed building and its gardens and park are designated Grade II on the Cadw/ICOMOS Register of Parks and Gardens of Special Historic Interest in Wales.

== History ==
The site of the castle was the location for several earlier fortifications, the first of which is said to have been built by Arnold le Boteler (Butler) in the mid-12th century. By the 16th century, a manor house owned by the Vaughan family stood on the site, its existence recorded by John Leland.

In 1642 the house was sold to the Wyndham family. Thomas Wyndham of Dunraven was MP for Glamorgan from 1789 to his death in 1814. He rebuilt the manor house as a castellated hunting lodge in 1802–1806. The building was designed by his wife, although it was probably based on Clearwell Castle.

The estate then passed to their daughter Caroline, who in 1810 had married the Irishman Windham Henry Quin (1782–1850), later 2nd Earl of Dunraven; in 1815 he assumed the additional name of Wyndham in right of his wife, becoming Windham Wyndham-Quin.

Caroline began remodelling the building in 1858; the central tower was replaced by a conservatory and the north and south wings were enlarged by Egbert Moxham. It was inherited by Edwin Wyndham-Quin, 3rd Earl of Dunraven and Mount-Earl, MP for Glamorganshire 1837–1851, and descendants. It was lived in until after the Second World War, having been used as a military hospital. The house was demolished in 1963.

The castle's walled garden, gatehouse and several other structures survive and are part of the Glamorgan Heritage Coast. They are designated Grade II on the Cadw/ICOMOS Register of Parks and Gardens of Special Historic Interest in Wales.

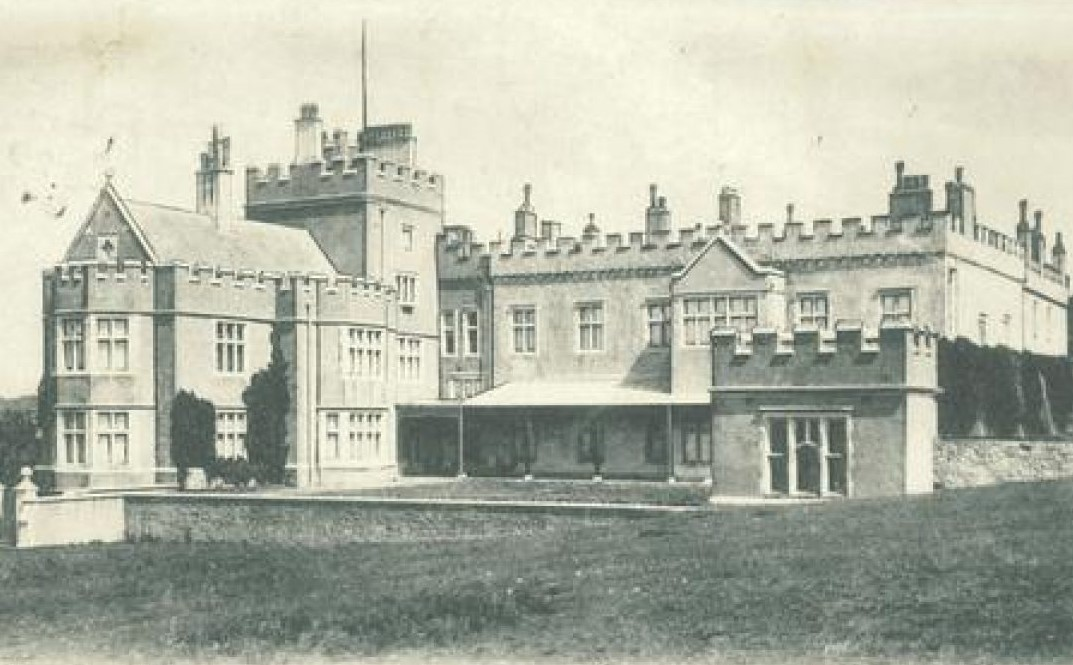
