= Windham Quin, 2nd Earl of Dunraven and Mount-Earl =

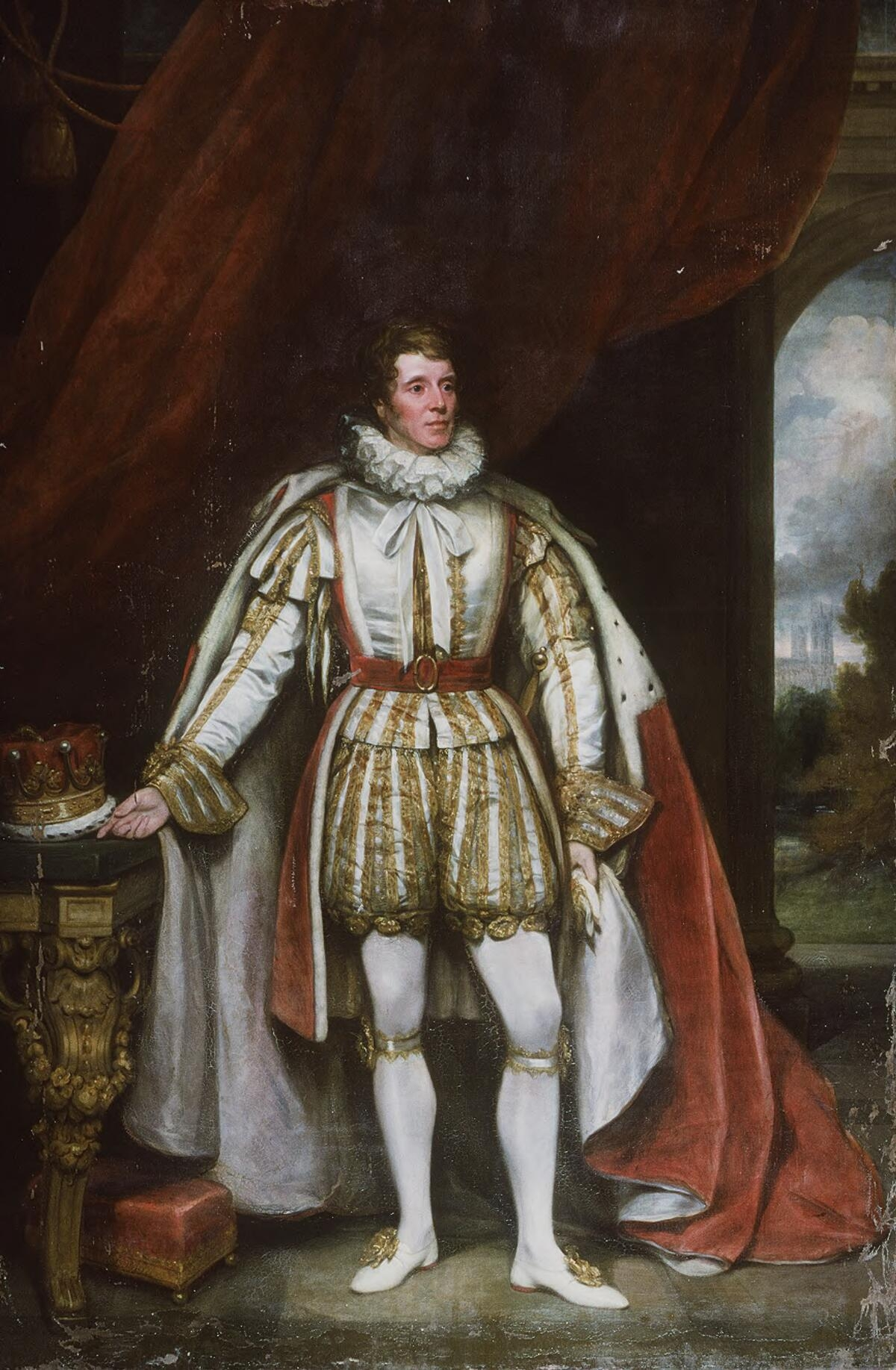
Windham Quin, 2nd Earl of Dunraven and Mount-Earl

Windham Henry Quin, 2nd Earl of Dunraven and Mount-Earl (4 September 1782 – 6 August 1850), styled Viscount Adare until 1822, was an Irish peer.

== Origin ==
He was the eldest son of Valentine Richard Quin, 1st Earl of Dunraven and Lady Frances Muriel Fox-Strangways, daughter of Stephen Fox-Strangways, 1st Earl of Ilchester, and his wife, the former Elizabeth Horner. He had one brother, Richard George Quin (1789–1843), who married Amelia Smith on 7 September 1813 and died without issue, and two sisters, Elizabeth who died young in August 1795, and Harriet, who married Sir William Payne-Gallwey, 1st Baronet and died in 1845.

He was styled Viscount Adare from 1822 until he succeeded to the Earldom on the death of his father in 1824. He took the additional surname of Wyndham, becoming Windham Wyndham Quin, on 7 April 1815.

== Life ==
He was appointed Custos Rotulorum of County Limerick for life in 1818. He served as an MP for County Limerick in the Parliament of the United Kingdom from 1806 to 1820. He was accused of corruption following the 1818 General Election, but after a full inquiry, the House of Commons exonerated him.

== Marriage and children ==
On 27 December 1810, he married Caroline, daughter and heiress of Thomas Wyndham of Dunraven Castle, Glamorgan and Clearwell, Gloucestershire. They had the following children:

- Edwin Wyndham-Quin, 3rd Earl of Dunraven (1812–1871)
- Captain the Hon. Windham Henry Wyndham Quin (2 November 1829 – 24 October 1865), who on 24 January 1856 married Caroline, third daughter of Rear Admiral George Tyler, K.H., of Cottrell, Glamorgan, M.P., and had issue.
- Lady Anna Maria Charlotte Wyndham Quin (21 November 1814 – 7 January 1855), who married William Monsell, 1st Baron Emly on 11 August 1836.

Parliament of the United Kingdom
Preceded by William Odell; Charles Silver Oliver	Member of Parliament for County Limerick; 1806–1820; With: William Odell 1806–1818; Richard FitzGibbon 1818–1820	Succeeded by Richard FitzGibbon; Standish O'Grady
Political offices
Preceded by The Earl of Lucan	Representative peer for Ireland; 1839–1850	Succeeded by The Lord Dunsany
Peerage of Ireland
Preceded by Valentine Richard Quin	Earl of Dunraven and Mount-Earl; 1824–1850	Succeeded by Edwin Richard Wyndham-Quin
