= Adare =

Village in County Limerick, Ireland

Adare Áth Dara
- Village
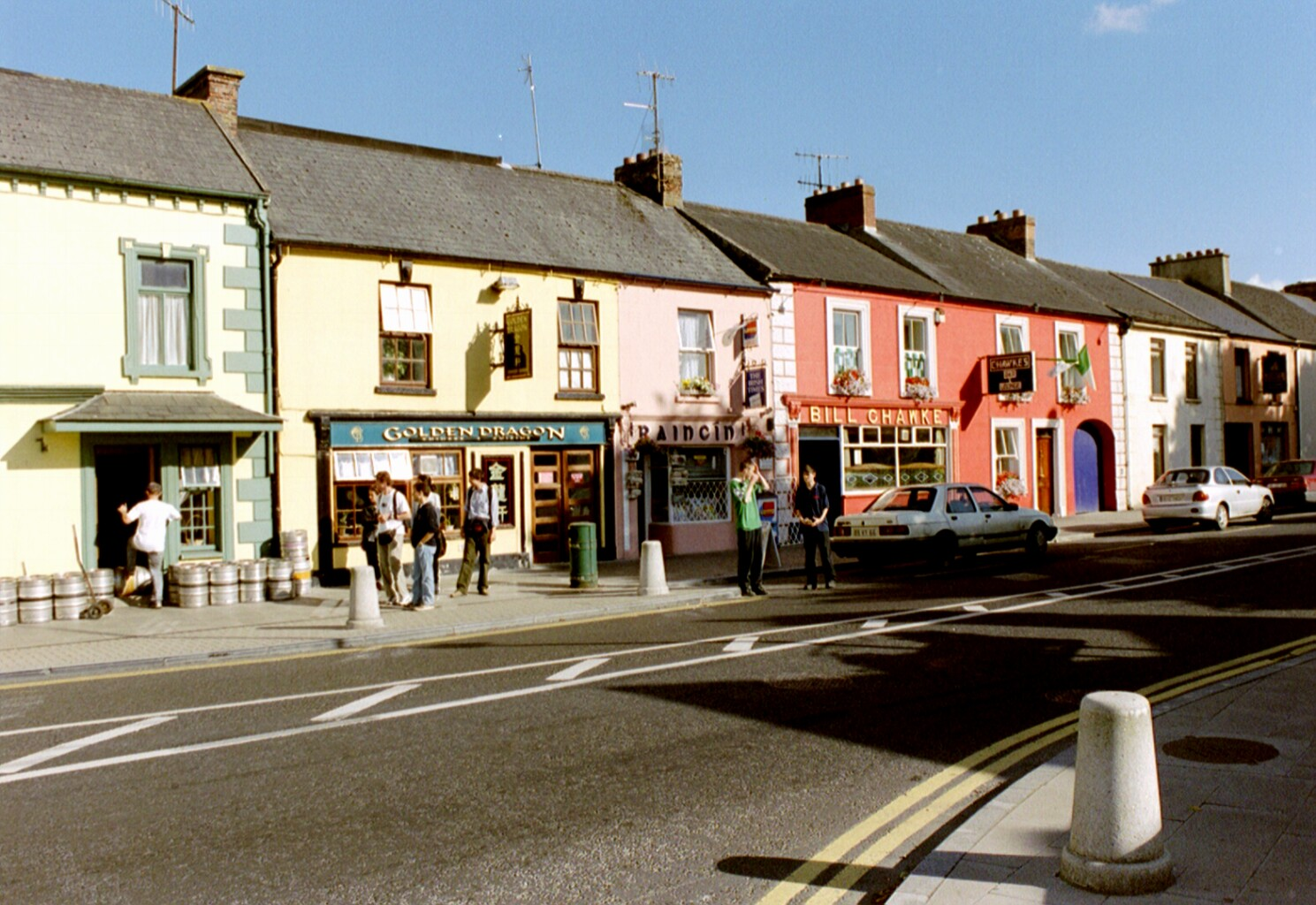
- Main Street

- Location in Ireland
- Coordinates: 52.564°N 8.790°W
- Country: Ireland
- Province: Munster
- County: County Limerick
- Dáil Éireann: Limerick County

Population (2016)
  - Total: 1,129
- Dialling code: 061
- Irish Grid Reference: R460460

Adare (/æˈdeɪr/; Irish: Áth Dara, meaning 'ford of [the] oak') is a village in County Limerick, Ireland, located southwest of the city of Limerick. Adare is designated as a heritage town by the Irish government. The village is in a townland and civil parish of the same name.

== History ==
The River Maigue is tidal as far as Adare, with the settlement forming around the eastern bank of the Maigue overlooking the fording point from which the village gets its name. An annalistic reference is made in the medieval Annals of Inisfallen at AI982.4 "The Tree of Mag Adar was broken by Leth Cuinn". Owing to the strategic importance of the river crossing the Desmond castle was built overlooking the site near Ardshanbally (derived from Ard an tSeanbhaile - 'high ground of the old town'), and was first mentioned in 1226. Historically a market town, in the Middle Ages, Adare had three monasteries.

On 7 June 1996, Detective Garda Jerry McCabe was killed by members of the Provisional IRA, during the attempted robbery of a post office van in the town.

=== Desmond Castle ===
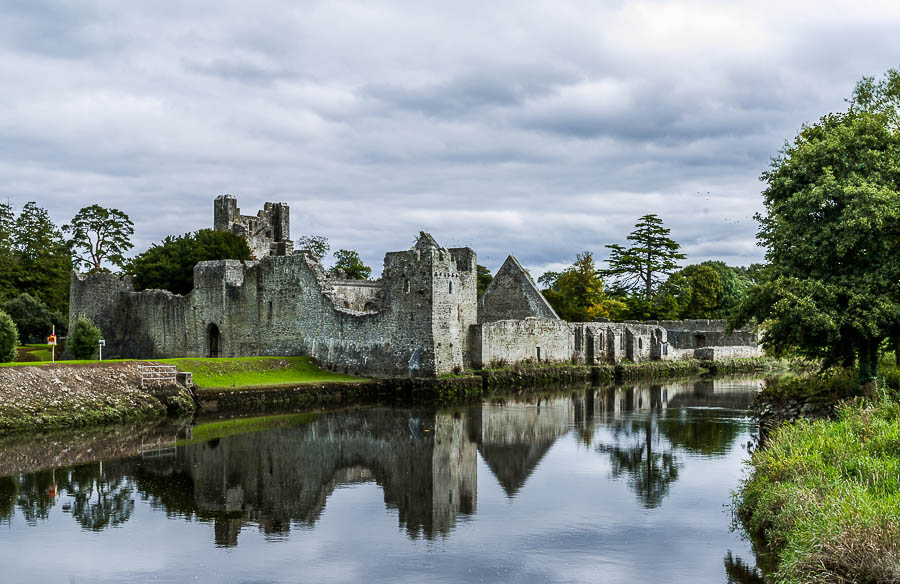
Desmond Castle, Adare

A castle or fortress is said to have first been built with an ancient ring-fort, by the O'Donovans, rulers of the region into the 12th century, and afterwards to have passed into the possession of the Kildare branch of the FitzGerald dynasty, who may be responsible for the majority of the remains of the present fortress (built around the same time as Croom Castle, also on the Maigue). Desmond Castle, as it is popularly known (after the FitzGeralds of Desmond), stands on the north bank of the Maigue. An extensive renovation has been in progress on the castle since 1996 and supervised tours are offered in the summer months. This is one of a series of significant Desmond properties, which also include Desmond Hall and Castle in Newcastle West, another castle in Askeaton and Castle Matrix near Rathkeale, further west in County Limerick.

=== Augustinian Priory ===
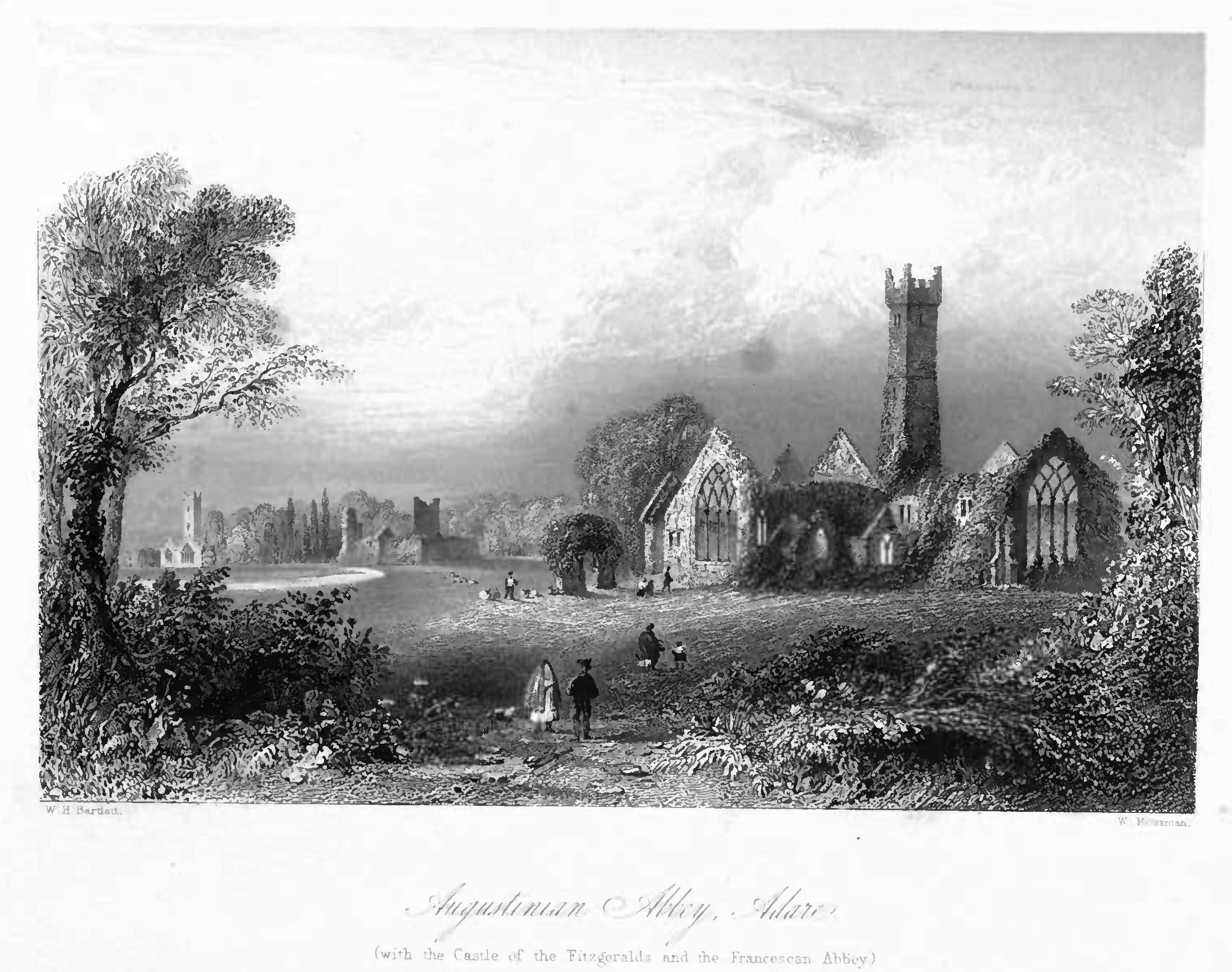
Augustinian Abbey, with the castle of the Fitzgeralds and the Franciscan Abbey, 1842

Adare's Augustinian Priory was founded in 1316 by John FitzThomas FitzGerald, 1st Earl of Kildare. The Priory was suppressed in the reign of Henry VIII. In 1807, the church of the Priory was given to the local Church of Ireland congregation as the parish church. In 1814, the refectory was roofed and converted into a schoolhouse. Between 1852 and 1854, a second restoration of the church was undertaken by Caroline, Countess of Dunraven.

=== Franciscan Abbey ===
The Franciscan friary, also known as the friary of St Michael the Archangel, was founded in 1464 by Thomas Fitz-Maurice, 7th Earl of Kildare and his wife Joan, and completed two years later. It is currently a ruin and is located inside the Adare Manor Golf Club.

=== Trinitarian Abbey ===
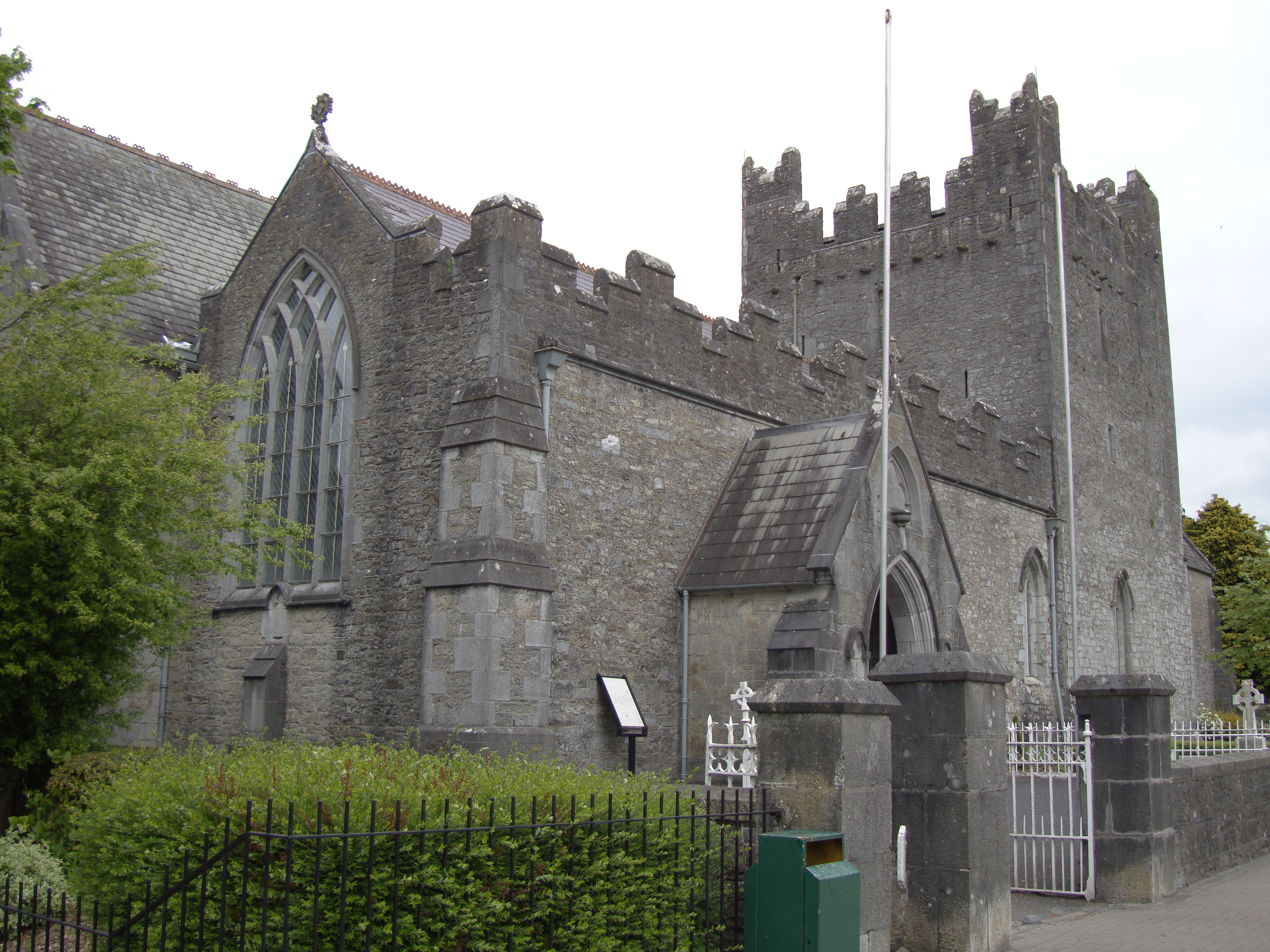
Trinitarian Monastery

The Trinitarian Order established their only monastery in Ireland in Adare in 1230. It is believed that the Trinitarian monks who came to Adare may have come from Scotland. The Abbey was restored in 1811 by the first Earl of Dunraven as the Catholic Parish church.

=== Adare Manor ===
Adare Manor is a mansion located on lands on the banks of the River Maigue and the former seat of the Earl of Dunraven and Mount-Earl. The present building was built in the early 19th-century in a Tudor-revival style, while retaining part of an earlier structure. It is now the Adare Manor Hotel & Golf Resort, a luxury resort hotel, reopened after an extensive restoration in October 2017.

=== Architecture ===
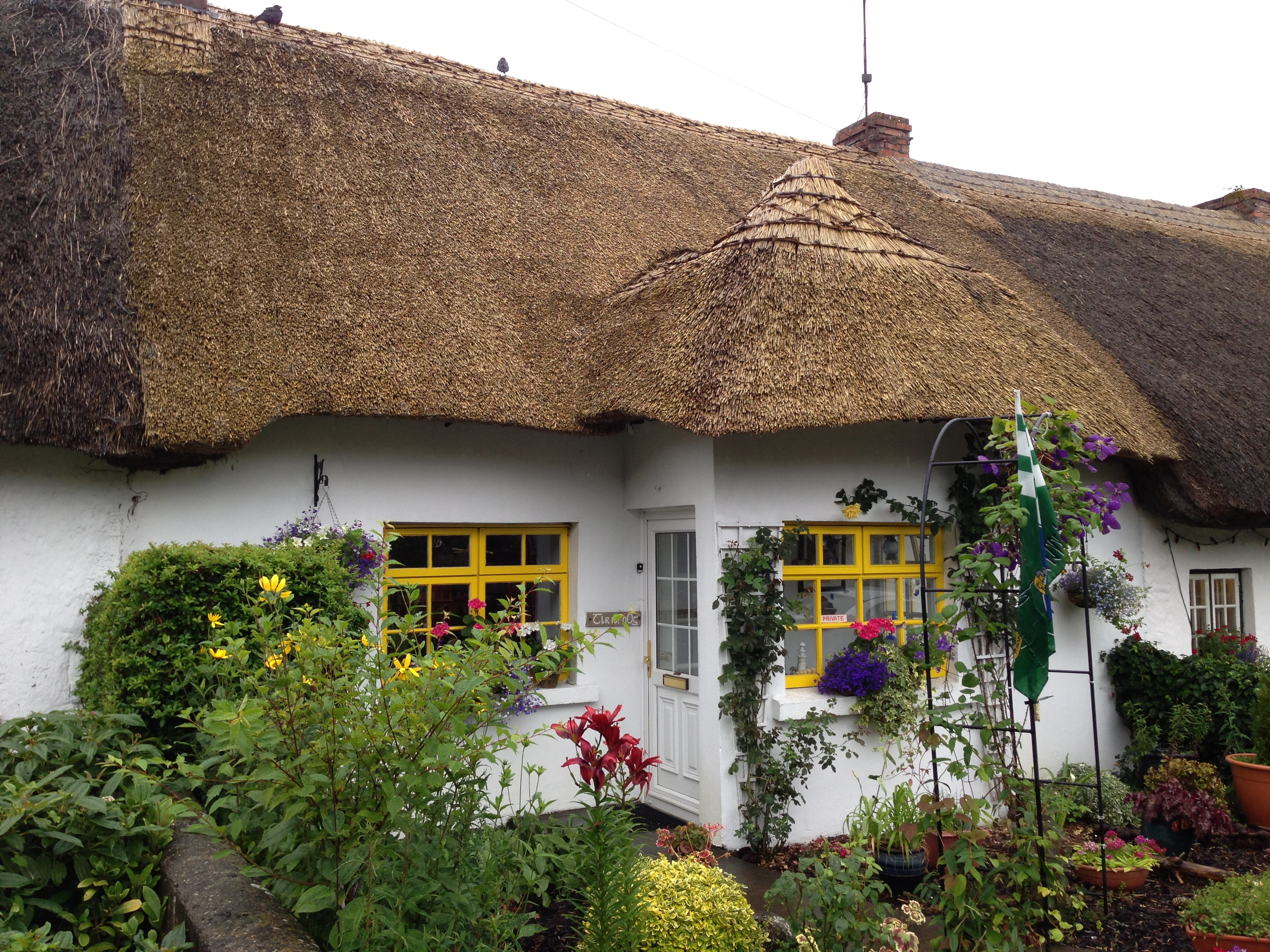
Tír na nÓg, a historic thatched cottage in Adare, pictured here in 2013. Built as part of the Dunraven estate in 1835–70, it was destroyed by a fire in June 2015.

The main street combines typical Irish architecture with the English styled buildings and infrastructure purpose-built for the Dunraven estate as an estate village. Examples of the latter architectural forms include the thatched cottages near the entrance to Adare Manor. The later 20th century additions were designed by Detmar Blow.

== Economy ==
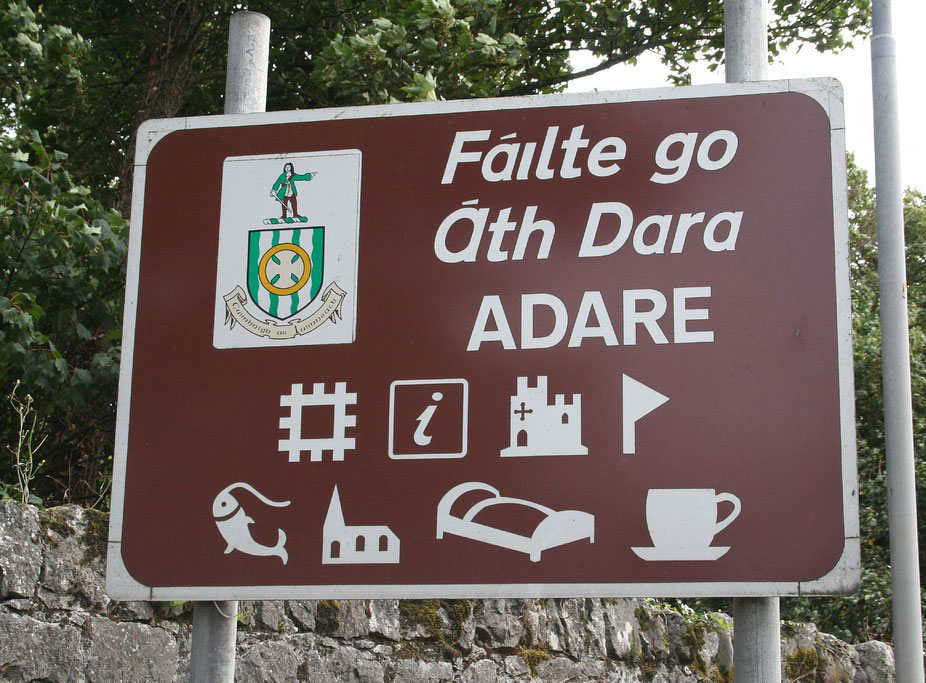
"Welcome to Adare" in Irish

Adare is a tourist destination and the local heritage centre, which gives insight into the history of the village, also hosts a number of craft shops. The village is a wedding and conference venue. Adare has two 18-hole golf courses - the Adare Golf Club, which incorporates a driving range and which was the site of the 2007 and 2008 Irish Open, the Adare Manor Golf Club and a pitch and putt course. Adare also has an equestrian centre, located in Clonshire.

=== Schools ===
There are four primary schools in Adare: St Joseph's National School (Catholic, boys), Our Lady's Abbey National School (Catholic, girls), St Nicholas' National School (Church of Ireland, mixed) and Shountrade National School (Catholic, mixed). The village's secondary school, Adare CBS, closed in 1973.

=== Transport ===
The main Limerick-Tralee road, the N21 passes through the village, causing persistent heavy congestions. In late 2015 a corridor for the long-delayed Adare Bypass was chosen that realigns the N21 road north of the village as part of a new dual carriageway planned to link Foynes port to Limerick. This route was updated ahead of a planned completion date of Summer 2027.

Adare is a stop on Bus Éireann's Limerick-Tralee/Killarney bus service and Dublin Coach's Dublin-Tralee/Killarney service. Both run hourly.

The disused "Limerick-Foynes" railway line passes 800 metres (half a mile) to the north-west of the village. Adare railway station, opened on 12 July 1856 by the Limerick & Foynes Railway company, was closed to passengers on 4 February 1963 and to freight on 2 December 1974. The line to Foynes continued to carry freight traffic until it was mothballed in 2001 and has seen no trains since 7 May 2002 when the annual Irish Rail weed spray train visited the line. The line, designated an engineers siding, is still officially open for traffic.

== Sport ==
The local Gaelic Athletic Association (GAA) club, Adare GAA, was founded in 1929. The club's senior hurling team has won the county championship in 2001, 2002, 2007, 2008 and 2009. In football, the club won the Limerick Senior Football Championship title for the first time in 2017. The club retained the title in 2018, and, having reached the finals in 2021, 2022 and 2023, losing to Newcastle West GAA each time, claimed it again in 2020 and 2024

The local association football (soccer) team is Adare United AFC. The club play at Deer Park Field, situated off the Blackabbey Road in the village. Founded in 1937, Adare United participates in the Limerick Desmond Schoolboys/Girls League at Under 8, U10, U12, U14 and U16 age groups and in the Limerick Desmond League at Junior (adult) and Youth level. The 2006/07 Season saw the club form its first ladies team, who competed in the Limerick Desmond Ladies League.

The Irish Open golf championship was staged at Adare in 2007 and 2008. There are two 18-hole golf courses in the village: The Adare Golf Club which is on the grounds of the Adare Manor Hotel, and the Adare Manor Golf Club, which is a separate entity. Adare will host the centenary Ryder Cup in 2027.

In athletics, the village has hosted the annual Adare 10K, held every February, since 1994.

== Twin towns ==
Adare has twinning connections to its sister towns in Germany.

- Buchloe, Germany
- Buckow, Germany

== See also ==
- List of towns and villages in Ireland
- Cliona O’Farrelly
- Nicholas Peacock
