= William Monsell, 1st Baron Emly =

Anglo-Irish landowner and politician

The Right Honourable The Lord Emly PC
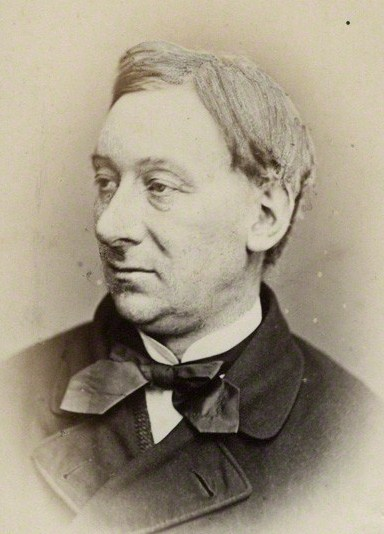

President of the Board of Health
- In office 9 February 1857 – 24 September 1857
- Monarch: Victoria
- Prime Minister: The Viscount Palmerston
- Preceded by: Hon. William Cowper
- Succeeded by: Hon. William Cowper

Paymaster General and Vice-President of the Board of Trade
- In office 12 March 1866 – 26 June 1866
- Monarch: Victoria
- Prime Minister: The Earl Russell
- Preceded by: George Goschen
- Succeeded by: Stephen Cave

Under-Secretary of State for the Colonies
- In office 10 December 1868 – 14 January 1871
- Monarch: Victoria
- Prime Minister: William Ewart Gladstone
- Preceded by: Charles Adderley
- Succeeded by: Edward Knatchbull-Hugessen

Postmaster General
- In office 14 January 1871 – 18 November 1873
- Monarch: Victoria
- Prime Minister: William Ewart Gladstone
- Preceded by: Marquess of Hartington
- Succeeded by: Lyon Playfair

Personal details
- Born: 21 September 1812
- Died: 20 April 1894 (aged 81)
- Party: Liberal
- Spouses: Lady Anna Wyndham-Quin (m. 1836; died 1855) Bertha de Montigny Boulainvilliers (m. 1857; died 1890)
- Education: Oriel College, Oxford

William Monsell, 1st Baron Emly, PC (21 September 1812 – 20 April 1894) was an Anglo-Irish landowner and Liberal politician. He held a number of ministerial positions between 1852 and 1873, notably as President of the Board of Health in 1857 and as Postmaster General between 1871 and 1873.

== Background and education ==
Monsell was born to William Monsell (1778–1822), of Tervoe, Clarina, County Limerick, and Olivia, daughter of Sir John Johnson-Walsh, 1st Baronet, of Ballykilcavan. He was educated at Winchester (1826–1830) and Oriel College, Oxford, but he left the university without proceeding to a degree in 1831. As his father had died in 1824, he succeeded to the family estates on coming of age and was a popular landlord, the more so as he was resident. In 1843 he helped found St Columba's College in Whitechurch, now part of Dublin.

== Political career ==
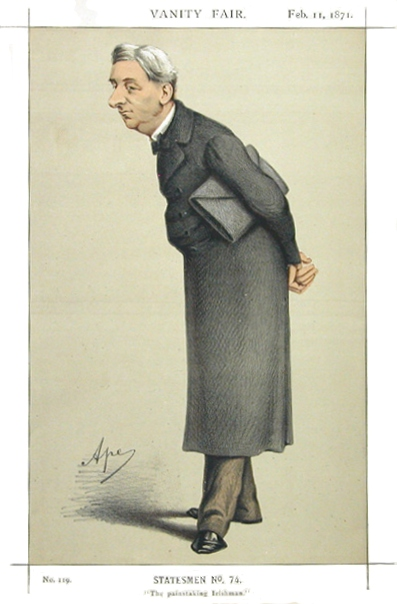
"The painstaking Irishman" As depicted by "Ape" (Carlo Pellegrini) in Vanity Fair, 11 February 1871

Monsell served as the Sheriff of County Limerick in 1835. In 1847, he was elected Member of Parliament for County Limerick as a Liberal, and represented the constituency until 1874. In 1850, he became a Catholic and thereafter took a prominent part in Catholic affairs, especially in Parliament. As a friend of Wiseman, Newman, Montalambert, W. G. Ward, and other eminent Catholics, he was intimately acquainted with the various interests of the Church, and his parliamentary position was often of great advantage to the Church.

In 1852 Monsell was appointed Clerk of the Ordnance by Lord Aberdeen, a post he retained until 1857, the last two years under the premiership of Lord Palmerston. In 1855 he was sworn of the Privy Council. He was briefly President of the Board of Health under Palmerston in 1857 and later served under Lord Russell as Paymaster General and Vice-President of the Board of Trade in 1866 and under William Ewart Gladstone as Under-Secretary of State for the Colonies between 1868 and 1871 and as Postmaster-General between January 1871 and November 1873. He was also Lord Lieutenant of County Limerick between 1871 and 1894 and Vice-Chancellor of the Royal University of Ireland between 1885 and 1894.

On 12 January 1874 Monsell was raised to the peerage as Baron Emly, of Tervoe in the County of Limerick. He lost much of his popularity in Ireland during his later years, because of his opposition to the Irish National Land League and to the home rule movement in Ireland. His work being chiefly parliamentary, he wrote little, but published some articles in the Home and Foreign Review and a "Lecture on the Roman Question" (1860).

== Family ==
Lord Emly was twice married. He married firstly Lady Anna Maria Charlotte Wyndham-Quin (1814–1855), only daughter of Windham Quin, 2nd Earl of Dunraven and Mount-Earl, in August 1836, with whom he had two sons, both of whom died in infancy. After her death on 7 January 1855, he married Bertha (1835–1890), youngest daughter the Comte de Montigny of the house of Montigny de Perreux, in 1857, by whom he had one son Gaston (1858–1932), later the second Lord Emly, and one daughter Mary Olivia (1860–1942). Lord Emly died in April 1894, aged 81.

== Arms ==
Coat of arms of William Monsell, 1st Baron Emly
| Notes Confirmed 18 December 1873 by Sir John Bernard Burke, Ulster King of Arms. Crest A lion rampant Proper holding between his paws a mullet Sable. Escutcheon Argent on a chevron between three mullets Sable a trefoil slipped Or. Motto Mone Sale |

== Sources ==
- Courtney, William Prideaux (1901). "Monsell, William" . In Lee, Sidney (ed.). Dictionary of National Biography (1st supplement). London: Smith, Elder & Co.
- Matthew Potter, William Monsell of Tervoe 1812–1894 Catholic Unionist, Anglo-Irishman, Foreword by Gearóid O Tuathaigh (Dublin: Irish Academic Press, 2009).
- Matthew Potter, 'A Catholic Unionist. The Life and Times of William Monsell, First Baron Emly of Tervoe 1812–1894', (unpublished Ph.D. thesis NUI Galway, 2001).

Parliament of the United Kingdom
| Preceded by William Smith O'Brien; Caleb Powell | Member of Parliament for County Limerick; 1847 – 1874; With: William Smith O'Brien 1847–1849; Samuel Dickson 1849–1850; Wyndham Goold 1850–1854; Stephen Edward de Vere 1854–1859; Samuel Auchmuty Dickson 1859–1865; Edward John Synan 1865–1874 | Succeeded by Edward John Synan; William Henry O'Sullivan |
Political offices
| Preceded by Hon. William Cowper | President of the Board of Health; 1857 | Succeeded by Hon. William Cowper |
| Preceded by George Goschen | Paymaster General; 1866 | Succeeded by Stephen Cave |
| Preceded by George Goschen | Vice-President of the Board of Trade; 1866 | Succeeded by Stephen Cave |
| Preceded by Charles Adderley | Under-Secretary of State for the Colonies; 1868–1871 | Succeeded by Edward Knatchbull-Hugessen |
| Preceded by Marquess of Hartington | Postmaster-General; 1871–1873 | Succeeded by Lyon Playfair |
Military offices
| Preceded by Francis Plunkett Dunne | Clerk of the Ordnance; 1852–1857 | Office abolished |
Honorary titles
| Preceded by The Earl of Dunraven and Mount-Earl | Lord Lieutenant of Limerick; 1871–1894 | Succeeded by Thomas Enraght O'Brien |
Peerage of the United Kingdom
| New creation | Baron Emly; 1874–1894 | Succeeded by Gaston Monsell |
