= Samuel Dickson =

Samuel Dickson may refer to:

- Samuel Dickson (American politician) (1807–1858), United States Representative from New York
- Samuel Henry Dickson (1798–1872), American poet, physician, writer and educator
- Samuel Dickson (Australian politician) (1866–1955), member of the South Australian House of Assembly
- Samuel J. Dickson (1867–1964), chief of the Toronto Police Department
- Samuel Dickson (died 1850), Member of the UK Parliament for County Limerick, 1849–1850
- Samuel Auchmuty Dickson (1817–1870), Member of the UK Parliament for County Limerick, 1859–1865
- Sam Dickson (1887–1911), American mechanic
- Sam Dickson (rugby union) (born 1989), New Zealand rugby sevens player

== See also ==
- Samuel Dixon (disambiguation)
