= Silver Oliver =

Silver Oliver may refer to:

- Silver Oliver (1736–1798), Irish MP and Privy Counsellor
- Silver Oliver (1770–1834), Irish MP
- Charles Silver Oliver (died 1817), Irish MP
- William Silver Oliver (1836–1908), Irish military surgeon
