= William Christmas =

William Christmas may refer to:

- William Christmas (basketball) (born 1996), American player
- William Christmas (Kilmallock MP) (1734–1803), Irish politician, MP for Kilmallock 1776–1783
- William Christmas (Waterford MP) (1798–1867), Irish politician, Conservative Party MP for Waterford City
- Billy Christmas (William Cecil Christmas, 1879–1941), Canadian sportsman
- William Whitney Christmas (1895–1960), American aviation pioneer and designer of the Christmas Bullet aircraft
- William A. Christmas (died 1970), participant in the 1970 Marin County courthouse incident
