= William Christmas (Kilmallock MP) =

Irish politician

Member of Parliament for Kilmallock
- In office 1776–1783
- Preceded by: Windham Quin
- Succeeded by: John Armstrong

Personal details
- Born: 24 September 1734
- Died: 26 January 1803 (aged 68)
- Occupation: Politician

William Christmas (24 September 1734 – 26 January 1803) was an Irish politician. He sat in the Irish House of Commons as a Member of Parliament (MP) for Kilmallock from 1776 to 1783.

Parliament of Ireland
| Preceded by Windham Quin; Thomas Maunsell | Member of Parliament for Kilkmallock; 1776–1783; With: Silver Oliver 1776–1777; John Finlay 1777–1783 | Succeeded by John Armstrong; John FitzGibbon |
