= Richard FitzGibbon, 3rd Earl of Clare =

Anglo-Irish politician and noble

The Right Honourable The Earl of Clare

Member of Parliament for County Limerick
- In office 1818–1841

Personal details
- Born: 2 October 1793 Mountshannon House, County Limerick
- Died: 10 January 1864 (aged 70) Kensington, London
- Resting place: St. Peter's Church, Aungier Street, Dublin
- Education: Harrow School

Military service
- Allegiance: United Kingdom
- Branch/service: British Army
- Years of service: 1808–1814
- Rank: Captain
- Unit: 1st Foot Guards; 2nd Ceylon Regiment
- Battles/wars: Napoleonic Wars; Peninsular War; Second Battle of Porto; Battle of Talavera

Richard Hobart FitzGibbon, 3rd Earl of Clare (2 October 1793 – 10 January 1864) was an Anglo-Irish politician and noble.

Born at Mountshannon House in County Limerick, FitzGibbon was educated at Harrow School. He joined the British Army, and was present at the Second Battle of Porto and Battle of Talavera.

At the 1818 UK general election, he stood in County Limerick for the Whigs, winning the seat. He rarely spoke in Parliament, and did not always vote in line with the Whig leadership. In turn, they offered him little support, but he nevertheless held his seat, sometimes describing himself as an independent. He served until 1841, when he stood down. He was appointed Governor of Limerick in 1818, and later served twice as Lord Lieutenant of Limerick.

In the 1820s, FitzGibbon had a child with Diana Woodcock, who was then married to Maurice Crosbie Moore. He obtained a divorce in 1825, by act of the House of Lords, and FitzGibbon and Woodcock immediately married. However, Moore secured custody of FitzGibbon's illegitimate child, despite stating that he was doing so purely out of vindictiveness. The couple had one legitimate child, John Charles Henry FitzGibbon, Viscount FitzGibbon, who was killed in the Battle of Balaklava in 1854. In 1851, FitzGibbon succeeded his brother as the Earl of Clare. He died in 1864.

Coat of arms of Richard FitzGibbon, 3rd Earl of Clare
Coronet A coronet of an Earl Crest A boar passant azure tusked and bristled or. Escutcheon Ermine a saltire gules on a chief or, three annulets of the second. Supporters Dexter: a lion or; Sinister: a tiger or. Motto Nil admirari. Marvel at nothing.

Parliament of the United Kingdom
Preceded by Windham Quin; William Odell	Member of Parliament for County Limerick; 1818–1841; With: Windham Quin 1818–1820; Standish O'Grady 1820–1826, 1830, 1830–1835; Thomas Lloyd 1826–1830; James Hewitt Massy Dawson 1830; William Smith O'Brien 1835–1841	Succeeded by William Smith O'Brien; Caleb Powell
Honorary titles
Preceded by The Earl of Clare	Lord Lieutenant of Limerick; 1851–1854	Succeeded by The Earl of Dunraven and Mount-Earl
New title	Lord Lieutenant of Limerick; 1831–1848	Succeeded by The Earl of Clare
Preceded by The Lord Muskerry	Governor of Limerick; 1818–1831	Became Lord Lieutenancy
Peerage of Ireland
Preceded by John FitzGibbon	Earl of Clare; 1851–1864	Extinct
