= Caleb Powell =

Irish politician (1793–1881)

Member of Parliament for County Limerick
- In office 10 July 1841 – 14 August 1847 Serving with William Smith O'Brien
- Preceded by: William Smith O'Brien; Richard FitzGibbon
- Succeeded by: William Smith O'Brien; William Monsell

Personal details
- Born: 1793
- Died: 21 February 1881 (aged 87–88)
- Party: Repeal Association
- Other political affiliations: Whig
- Education: Trinity College, Dublin

Caleb Powell (1793 – 24 February 1881) was an Irish Repeal Association and Whig politician.

Powell was first elected Whig MP for County Limerick at the 1841 general election and held the seat until 1847 when, standing as a Repeal Association candidate, he was defeated.

He was High Sheriff of County Limerick in 1858.

Parliament of the United Kingdom
Preceded by William Smith O'Brien; Richard FitzGibbon	Member of Parliament for County Limerick; 1841–1847; With: William Smith O'Brien	Succeeded by William Smith O'Brien; William Monsell
