= John FitzGibbon, 1st Earl of Clare =

Anglo-Irish politician

The Right Honourable The Earl of Clare PC (Ire)
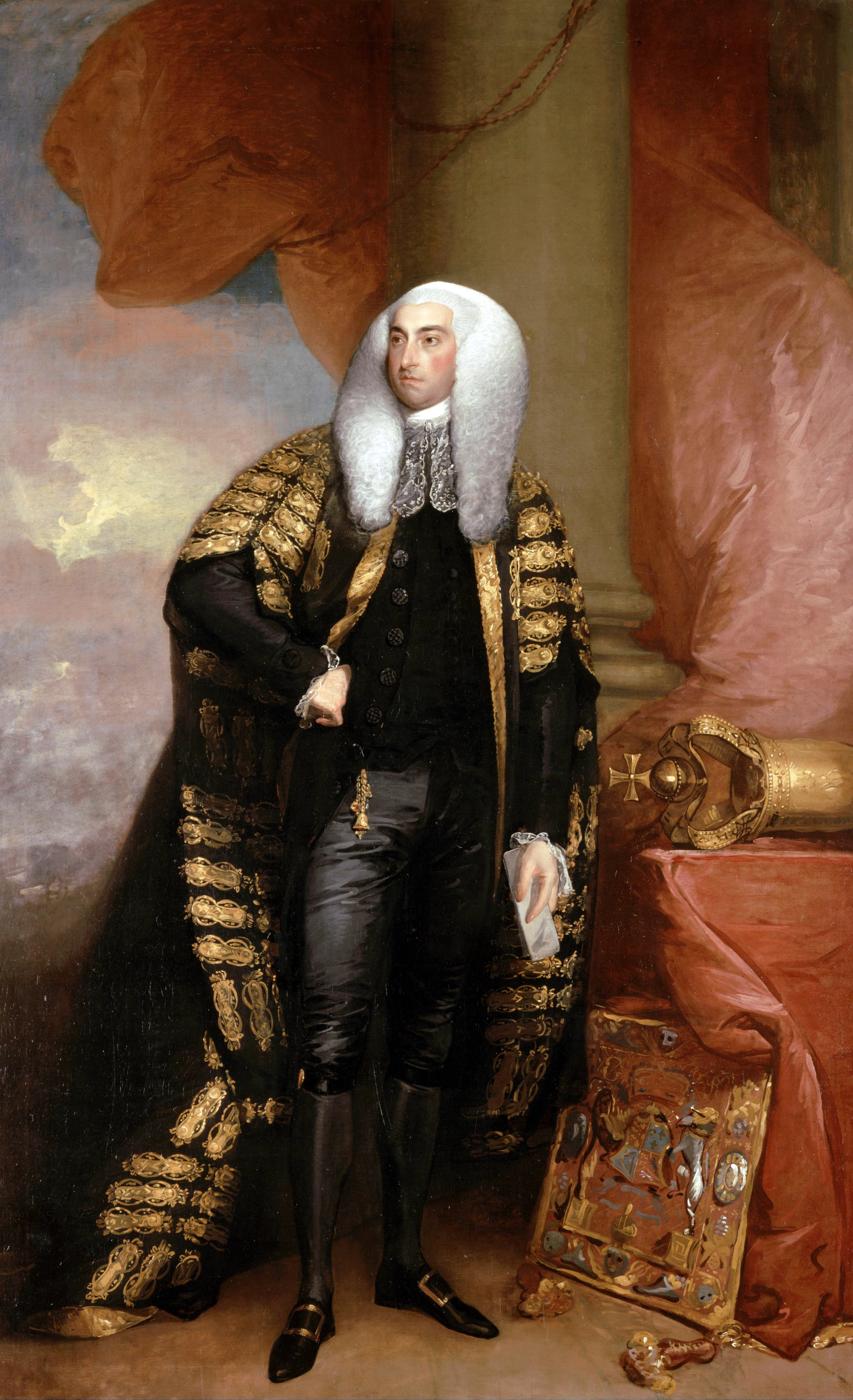
- Portrait by Gilbert Stuart, 1789

Lord Chancellor of Ireland
- In office 20 June 1789 – 28 January 1802
- Monarch: George III
- Preceded by: The Viscount Lifford

Attorney-General for Ireland
- In office 29 Nov 1783 – 20 June 1789
- Preceded by: The Viscount Avonmore
- Succeeded by: The Viscount Kilwarden

Member of Parliament for Kilmallock
- In office 1783–1790 Serving with John Armstrong
- Preceded by: John Finlay; William Christmas
- Succeeded by: Charles Bury; John Armstrong

Member of Parliament for Dublin University
- In office 1778–1783 Serving with Walter Hussey-Burgh
- Preceded by: Walter Hussey-Burgh; Richard Hely-Hutchinson
- Succeeded by: Lawrence Parsons; Arthur Browne

Personal details
- Born: 1748 Donnybrook, Dublin, Kingdom of Ireland
- Died: 28 January 1802 (aged 53) 6 Ely Place, Dublin, United Kingdom of Great Britain and Ireland
- Resting place: St. Peter's Churchyard
- Children: 5, including John and Richard
- Education: Trinity College Dublin; Christ Church, Oxford
- Profession: Lawyer, Politician

John FitzGibbon, 1st Earl of Clare PC (Ire) (1748 – 28 January 1802) was an Anglo-Irish politician who served as the Attorney-General for Ireland from 1783 to 1789 and Lord Chancellor of Ireland from 1789 to 1802. He remains a deeply controversial figure in Irish history, being described variously as an old fashioned anti-Catholic Whig political party hardliner and an early advocate of the Act of Union between Ireland and Great Britain (which finally happened in 1801, shortly before his death).

Fitzgibbon is said to have been an early and extremely militant opponent of Catholic Emancipation (the end of religious persecution, and the limited relaxation of both the religious discrimination and civil disabilities placed upon Catholics throughout the British Isles and the British Empire). The Earl may also have been the first person to suggest to King George III that granting Royal Assent to any form of Catholic Emancipation would violate his coronation oath.

== Early life ==
FitzGibbon was born near Donnybrook, Dublin, the son of John FitzGibbon of Ballysheedy, County Limerick, and his wife Isabella Grove, daughter of John Grove, of Ballyhimmock, County Cork. His father had been born a Catholic but converted to the state religion in order to become a lawyer, and amassed a large fortune. He had three sisters, Arabella, Elizabeth, and Eleanor.

He was educated at Trinity College Dublin and Christ Church, Oxford. He entered the Irish House of Commons in 1778 as Member for Dublin University, and held this seat until 1783, when he was appointed Attorney General. From the same year, he represented Kilmallock until 1790. He was appointed High Sheriff of County Limerick for 1782.

When appointed Lord Chancellor for Ireland in 1789, he was granted his first peerage as Baron FitzGibbon, of Lower Connello in the County of Limerick, in the Peerage of Ireland that year. This did not entitle him to a seat in the British House of Lords, only in the Irish House of Lords. His later promotions came mostly in the Peerage of Ireland, being advanced to a Viscountcy (1793) and the Earldom of Clare in 1795. He finally achieved a seat in the British House of Lords in 1799 when created Baron FitzGibbon, of Sidbury in the County of Devon, in the Peerage of Great Britain.

== FitzGibbon as Lord Chancellor ==
John FitzGibbon, 1st Earl of Clare, was a renowned champion of the Protestant Ascendancy and an opponent of Catholic emancipation. He despised the Parliament of Ireland's popular independent Constitution of 1782. He was also personally and politically opposed to the Irish politician Henry Grattan who urged a moderate course in the Irish Parliament, and was responsible for defeating Grattan's efforts to reform the Irish land tithe system (1787–1789) under which Irish Catholic farmers (and all non-Anglican farmers) were forced to financially support the minority Anglican Church of Ireland. These were not fully repealed until 1869, (when the Church of Ireland was finally disestablished), although Irish tithes were commuted after the Tithe War (1831–1836).

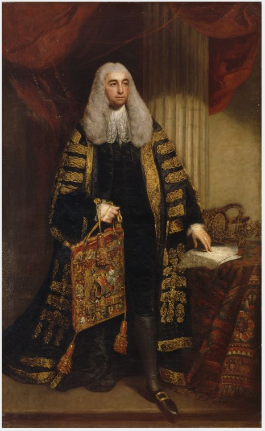
circa 1800

FitzGibbon opposed the Irish Roman Catholic Relief Act 1793, for which, in a "magnificently controlled vituperation in vigorous, colloquial heroic couplets,"The Gibbonade, he was pilloried by the satirist Henrietta Battier. But acceding to pressure exerted through the Irish executive by government of William Pitt in London, intent, in advance of war with the new French Republic, to placate Catholic opinion, he was persuaded to recommend its acceptance in the Irish House of Lords. Pitt, and the King, who had been petitioned by delegates from the Catholic Committee in Dublin, expected Ireland to follow the British Roman Catholic Relief Act 1791 and admit Catholics to the parliamentary franchise (although not to Parliament itself), enter the professions and assume public office.

Lord FitzGibbon's role in the recall, soon after his arrival, of the popular pro-Emancipation Lord Lieutenant, Lord Fitzwilliam, is debatable. Although FitzGibbon was probably politically opposed to the Lord Lieutenant of Ireland, Fitzwilliam was apparently recalled, because of his own independent actions. Fitzwilliam was known to be friendly to the Ponsonby family (he was married to one of their daughters), and was generally a Foxite liberal Whig. His close association with and patronage of Irish Whigs led by Grattan and Ponsonby during his short tenure, along with his alleged support of an immediate effort to secure Catholic emancipation in a manner not authorized by the British cabinet is probably what led to his recall. Thus, if any is to blame in the short-lived 'Fitzwilliam episode' it is the great Irish politician Henry Grattan and the Ponsonby brothers - presumably William Ponsonby, later Lord Imokilly and his brother John Ponsonby—not to mention Lord Fitzwilliam himself. Irish Catholics at the time and later naturally saw things very differently and blamed hardline Protestants such as FitzGibbon.

Irish Catholics and FitzGibbon agreed on one point apparently - Irish political and economic union with Great Britain (which eventually took place in 1801). Pitt had wanted Union with Ireland concomitantly with Catholic emancipation, commutation of tithes, and the endowment of the Irish Catholic priesthood. Union was opposed by most hardline Irish Protestants, as well as liberals such as Grattan. FitzGibbon had been a strong supporter of the Union since 1793 but refused to have Catholic emancipation with the Union.

In a speech to the Irish House of Lords on 10 February 1800, Lord Fitzgibbon elucidated his point of view on union:

I hope and feel as becomes a true Irishman, for the dignity and independence of my country, and therefore I would elevate her to her proper station, in the rank of civilised nations. I wish to advance her from the degraded post of mercenary province, to the proud station of an integral and governing member of the greatest empire in the world.

In the end, FitzGibbon's views won out, leading to the Union of Ireland with Great Britain to form the United Kingdom of Great Britain and Ireland without any concessions for Ireland's Catholic majority (or for that matter, Catholics in the rest of the new United Kingdom). FitzGibbon later claimed that he had been duped by the way in which the Act was passed (by the new Viceroy Lord Cornwallis promising reforms to Irish Catholics), and was bitterly opposed to any concessions during the short remainder of his life.

== FitzGibbon as Lord Chancellor in the Irish Rebellion of 1798 ==
The role of the Earl of Clare (as FitzGibbon had become in 1795) as Lord Chancellor of Ireland during the period of the 1798 rebellion is questionable. According to some, he supported a hardline policy which used torture, murder and massacre to crush the rebellion, or that as Lord Chancellor, he had considerable influence on military affairs, and that martial law could not have been imposed without his consent. Others allege that as Lord Chancellor, he had no say in military affairs and the Encyclopædia Britannica states that he was "neither cruel nor immoderate and was inclined to mercy when dealing with individuals"; however, the same source also states that "(FitzGibbon).. was a powerful supporter of a repressive policy toward Irish Catholics". Lord Clare's former side was displayed by sparing the lives of the captured United Irish leaders, 'State prisoners', in return for their confession of complicity and provision of information relating to the planning of the rebellion. However, this willingness of the prisoners to partake of the agreement was spurred by the execution of the brothers John and Henry Sheares on 14 July 1798.

In contrast to the leniency shown to the largely upper-class leadership, the full weight of military repression was inflicted upon the common people throughout the years 1797–98 with untold thousands suffering imprisonment, torture, transportation and death. Lord Clare, as he now was, was inclined to show no mercy to unrepentant rebels and, in October 1798, he expressed his disgust upon the capture of Wolfe Tone that he had been granted a trial, and his belief that Tone should have been hanged as soon as he set foot on land.

He was quick to recognise that sectarianism was a useful ally to divide the rebels and prevent the United Irishmen from achieving their goal of uniting Protestant, Catholic and Dissenter, writing in June 1798; "In the North nothing will keep the rebels quiet but the conviction that where treason has broken out the rebellion is merely popish".

Another anecdote is to the effect of his callousness. Supposedly, upon being informed during a debate in the Irish Parliament that innocent as well as guilty were suffering atrocities during the repression, Lord Clare replied "Well suppose it were so..", his callous reply purportedly shocking William Pitt.

== FitzGibbon as a Landlord ==
Lord Clare was noted by some as a good, improving landlord to both his Protestant and Catholic tenants. Some claim that the tenants of his Mountshannon estate called him "Black Jack" FitzGibbon. There is, however, no evidence to support this claim, although there is little to no evidence on his dealings as a landlord. Irish nationalists and others point out that while he might have been interested in the welfare of his own tenants on his own estate, he treated other Irish Catholics very differently. Without further evidence, Lord Clare's role as a Protestant landowner in mainly Catholic Ireland is of little importance against his known dealings as Lord Chancellor.

== Apocryphal story about his funeral ==
Lord Clare died at home, 6 Ely Place near St. Stephen's Green, Dublin on 28 January 1802 and was buried in St. Peter's Churchyard. A hero to Protestant hardliners, but despised by the majority Catholic population, his funeral cortege was the cause of a riot and there is a widespread story that a number of dead cats were thrown at his coffin as it departed Ely Place.

== Summary ==
FitzGibbon appears to have made little mark in British political history, as compared to Irish parliamentary history. His adversary Henry Grattan and the aristocratic rebel Lord Edward FitzGerald (with the other rebels of 1798) are better remembered. FitzGibbon was apparently a hardline Protestant, a landlord and a member of the Protestant Ascendancy, who naturally supported those political measures that would preserve Protestant domination of Ireland and the continued suppression of the numerically dominant Catholics in Ireland. He won his point in 1801 and its immediate aftermath, when the Irish Parliament was dissolved and Union with Great Britain was achieved - without any concessions to Catholics. In the long run, his views lost out, as subsequent British Cabinets were forced to concede full rights to Catholics in 1829 (while imposing new voting restrictions in Ireland and thus disenfranchising poorer Catholics). The Union with Great Britain, so bitterly opposed by Henry Grattan, was eventually dissolved partially more than a century later.

FitzGibbon's most significant achievement (historically speaking) was probably his convincing King George III that any concessions to Catholics, whether in Great Britain or in Ireland, would mean that the King was violating his Coronation Oath. Thus, the King and his second son became staunch opponents of pro-Emancipation measures, which had to wait until both had died. In thus convincing the King (probably between 1793 and 1801), FitzGibbon's policy of repression towards Irish Catholics achieved its finest hour; in doing so, he also defeated all that Grattan and his party had worked to obtain. Furthermore, he also brought about Pitt's downfall, because Pitt had staked his own reputation on obtaining Catholic emancipation concurrently with the Act of Union. No other British Prime Minister would make such efforts for a long time. FitzGibbon thus had a negative role not only in Irish parliamentary and political history, but also in British political history.

By negating all of Grattan's efforts 1787-1789 and those of Pitt in the late 1790s to 1801, FitzGibbon allowed conditions to develop that would benefit sectarian leaders and political philosophies from both religious communities. It is unclear if FitzGibbon's support of Grattan, or support for Pitt's proposals would have made much difference, given that many hardline Protestants probably felt the same way as FitzGibbon. Furthermore, the British Cabinet (not to mention the Royal Family, then far more influential politically) was itself divided on the issue for most of the period. But just as Catholic Emancipation was brought about by a Tory Prime Minister in 1829, or substantial voting reforms brought about by Disraeli and the Conservatives, thus winning support from a crucial minority of those originally opposed to either, the support of a prominent hardline Protestant leader for Catholic Emancipation might have made all the difference to Irish history.

Sir Jonah Barrington's estimate of Fitzgibbon:- "His political conduct has been accounted uniform, but in detail, it will be found to have been miserably inconsistent. In 1781 he took up arms to obtain a declaration of Irish independence; in 1800, he recommended the Introduction of a military force to assist in its extinguishment; he pro¬claimed Ireland a free nation in 1783, and argued that it should be a pro¬vince in 1799; in 1782 he called the acts of the British Legislature toward* Ireland “ a daring usurpation on the rights of a free people,"* and in 1800 he transferred Ireland to the usurper. On all occasions his ambition as despotically governed his politics, as his reason invariably sunk before his prejudice." 'The Rise and Fall of the Irish Nation' (1853)(p. 9)

== Titles and Arms ==
- Baron FitzGibbon, of Lower Connello in the County of Limerick, in the Peerage of Ireland on appointment as Lord Chancellor of Ireland in 1789,
- Viscount FitzGibbon, of Limerick in the County of Limerick, in the Peerage of Ireland in 1793,
- Earl of Clare in the Peerage of Ireland in 1795.
- Baron FitzGibbon, of Sidbury in the County of Devon, in the Peerage of Great Britain, in 1799.

Coat of arms of John FitzGibbon, 1st Earl of Clare
Coronet A coronet of an Earl Crest A boar passant azure tusked and bristled or. Escutcheon Ermine a saltire gules on a chief or, three annulets of the second. Supporters Dexter: a lion or; Sinister: a tiger or. Motto Nil admirari. Marvel at nothing.

== Sources ==
- The Irish Act of Union - Patrick M. Geoghegan (2001)
- A Volley of Execrations: the letters and papers of John Fitzgibbon, earl of Clare, 1772–1802, edited by D. A. Fleming and A. P. W. Malcomson. (2004)
- Oxford Dictionary of National Biography

Political offices
Preceded by Barry Yelverton	Attorney General for Ireland; 1783–1789	Succeeded by Arthur Wolfe
In commission Title last held by The Viscount Lifford	Lord Chancellor of Ireland; 1789–1802	Succeeded by John Freeman-Mitford
Parliament of Ireland
Preceded by Walter Hussey-Burgh; Richard Hely-Hutchinson	Member of Parliament for Dublin University; 1778–1783; With: Walter Hussey-Burgh 1778–1782; Laurence Parsons 1782–1783	Succeeded by Laurence Parsons; Arthur Browne
Preceded by John Finlay; William Christmas	Member of Parliament for Kilmallock; 1783–1790; With: John Armstrong	Succeeded by Charles William Bury; John Armstrong
Peerage of Ireland
New creation	Earl of Clare; 3rd creation 1795–1802	Succeeded by John FitzGibbon
New creation	Viscount FitzGibbon; 1793–1802	Succeeded by John FitzGibbon
New creation	Baron FitzGibbon (of Lower Connello); 1789–1802	Succeeded by John FitzGibbon
Peerage of Great Britain
New creation	Baron FitzGibbon (of Sidbury); 1799–1802	Succeeded by John FitzGibbon
