= Thomas Casey (Kilmallock MP) =

Irish politician (1765–1840)

Thomas Casey JP (1765 – 8 May 1840) was an Irish politician and barrister who was a Member of Parliament for Kilmallock in the Irish House of Commons from 1800 to 1801.

From 1808 to 1824, he served as Barrister-Magistrate at Marlborough Street.

Casey was the only son of Thomas Casey and Helen O'Houghragan. He married firstly Anna de Cloisé. After her death, he married secondly Wilhelmina Forth, daughter and co-heir of Neville Forth of Newton House, County Meath. With his second wife, he had two daughters: Anna Alicia, who married Rev. William Ogle Moore, Dean of Clogher; and Helen Matilda, and a son, Edmond Henry Casey. Thomas Casey Lyons was his grandson.

Casey died 8 May 1840 at Ely Place, Dublin and was buried at Coolock. Following his death, the Dublin Evening Mail wrote of him:

Mr. Casey was remarkable man, in remarkable times, and presented in every sense and acceptation of the term, a singularly favourable specimen of the Irish gentleman of the old school. Bland and social in habit—warm and frank in manner—cordial and sincere in feeling—courteous and polished demeanour, he was once respected and beloved. With a memory richly stored, and a mind highly cultivated, he was the attraction and the ornament of every circle in which he moved... throughout a long and varied life, Mr. Casey sustained his character for honour—independence—high-mindedness and fidelity: and was pre-eminently distinguished for kindliness of heart, gentleness of deportment, and amiability of disposition.

— Dublin Evening Mail, 11 May 1840

Parliament of Ireland
Preceded by Charles Silver Oliver; Sir Valentine Quin, Bt	Member of Parliament for Kilmallock; 1800–1801; With: Sir Valentine Quin, Bt	Succeeded by Parliament of the United Kingdom
