= William Odell (MP) =

British Member of Parliament

William Odell (1752 – 1831) was an Irish Member of Parliament for Limerick.

== Early life ==
William Odel was born in 1752, the eldest son of Captain John Odel of Fort William House Bealdurogy, County Limerick and his third wife, Jane Baylee of Lough Gur, County Limerick. He was educated at Trinity College Dublin, graduating in 1768. He was twice married, first to Aphra Crone (died Sept. 1814), daughter of John Crone of Doneraile, County Cork, with whom he had seven sons and five daughters. In 1818 he married Anna Maria Finucane of Ennis, niece and heir of Fr. James Finucane, Catholic priest and substantial landowner, of Kilfarboy, County Clare.

== Public life ==
Odell held several offices apart from being a Member of Parliament. He was High Sheriff of County Limerick between 1789 and 1790. In 1793 he was made Lieutenant Colonel of the newly formed County Limerick Militia. He sat in the Irish House of Commons for County Limerick. In 1817 with John Maxwell-Barry he became the first Irish Commissioners of the Treasury after that office was merged with Lord High Treasurer of Ireland.

While a member of the Irish House of Commons, Odell was a supporter of the Act of Union and boasted at the time that he was the only member that did so without seeking reward. As a member of the House of Commons, he first came to notice when in 1803, along with Charles Silver Oliver, the other County Limerick MP, he voted with the Opposition for an inquiry into the finances of the Prince of Wales's finances. He was down as a supporter of the second Pitt administration but this was conditional on obtaining a position in the army for his son. This intrigue continued after Grenville became Prime Minister after Pitt's death in 1806. Grenville was less accommodating than Pitt so Odell transferred his support to Portland and Portland rewarded him with an office for his son. During this period Odell increased his commitment to the Militia and was away from Parliament. Indeed, throughout his Parliamentary career there is no record of him speaking though he did vote on occasion. he did make time, however, in 1808 and 1813 to be present to support Catholic Relief. The government needed support of Irish MPs, and Odell was one of those that supported the Walcheren Campaign, and likewise he supported the government by opposing various attempts at reform. He was returned in 1812 unopposed.

Between 1811 and 1814 he was a member of the board of the Lord High Treasurer of Ireland, and after that office was abolished in 1816 he served on the board of Lords Commissioners of the Treasury until he lost his seat in 1819. In that period he continued to support Catholic Relief and at one stage quoted as saying he "... should always vote for everything favourable to the Roman Catholics..." For the remainder of the decade Odell was an infrequent attender at Parliament though he did make the effort to attend whenever the matter of Catholic Relief came up. He also continued to canvas for his son to receive an office. No office for his son was forthcoming neither was any other office for Odell and in the 1818 election he was forced to step aside because of lack of government support. Throughout his political career Odell was supported by the Lords Clare who acted as his patron as he had little means of his own. He was succeeded in his seat by Richard Hobart FitzGibbon, the second son (and later third Earl) of 1st Earl of Clare.

== Later life ==
In 1818 the year he lost his seat Odell married Anna Maria Finucane, a Catholic, and this did not endear him to the Establishment. Having failed to secure for himself or his sons any office and income attached to the office his financial difficulties increased. He was unable to pay his debts and as a result he was confined to Marshalsea debtors' prison where he remained for 12 years until his death in 1831.

Parliament of Ireland
Preceded by John Massy; John Waller	Member of Parliament for County Limerick; 1798 – 1801; With: John Waller 1798	Succeeded by Parliament of the United Kingdom
Parliament of the United Kingdom
Preceded by NA	Member of Parliament for County Limerick 1801-1818; With: John Waller 1801–1802; Charles Silver Oliver 1802–1806; Windhan Henry Quin 1806-1820	Succeeded by Richard Hobart Fitzgibbon
