= 1871 County Limerick by-election =

UK Parliamentary by-election

The 1871 County Limerick by-election was fought on 28 January 1871. The by-election was fought due to the incumbent Liberal MP William Monsell, becoming Postmaster General. It was retained unopposed by William Monsell.
