= Governor Romer =

Governor Romer may refer to:

- John Romer (politician), Governor of Bombay in 1831
- René Römer (1929–2003), Governor of the Netherlands Antilles from 1983 to 1990
- Roy Romer, 39th Governor of Colorado
