= County Limerick (UK Parliament constituency) =

UK parliamentary constituency in Ireland, 1801–1885

- Former county constituency for the House of Commons
- County: County Limerick

1801–1885
- Seats: 2
- Created from: County Limerick (IHC)
- Replaced by: East Limerick; West Limerick

County Limerick was a parliamentary constituency in Ireland, which returned two Members of Parliament (MPs) to the House of Commons of the Parliament of the United Kingdom from 1801 to 1885.

== Boundaries ==
This constituency comprised County Limerick, except for the parliamentary borough of Limerick, which was formed by the Limerick City constituency.

== Members of Parliament ==
Year	1st Member	1st Party	2nd Member	2nd Party
1801, 1 Jan	John Waller		William Odell	
1802, 22 July	Charles Silver Oliver		William Odell	
1806, 22 November	Windham Quin, later Earl of Dunraven & Mt Earl	Tory	William Odell	
1818, 8 July	Windham Quin, later Earl of Dunraven & Mt Earl	Tory	Richard FitzGibbon, later Earl of Clare	Whig
1820, 30 March	Standish O'Grady, later Viscount Guillamore	Whig	Richard FitzGibbon, later Earl of Clare	Whig
1826, 23 Jun	Thomas Lloyd	Tory	Richard FitzGibbon, later Earl of Clare	Whig
1830, 2 Feb	Standish O'Grady, later Viscount Guillamore	Whig	Richard FitzGibbon, later Earl of Clare	Whig
1830, 3 May	James Hewitt Massy Dawson	Tory	Richard FitzGibbon, later Earl of Clare	Whig
1830, 10 Aug	Standish O'Grady, later Viscount Guillamore	Whig	Richard FitzGibbon, later Earl of Clare	Whig
1835, 15 Jan	William Smith O'Brien	Whig	Richard FitzGibbon, later Earl of Clare	Whig
1841, 10 Jul	William Smith O'Brien	Whig	Caleb Powell	Whig
1847, 14 Aug	William Smith O'Brien	Irish Confederation	William Monsell, later Baron Emly	Peelite
1849, 1 Jun	Samuel Dickson	Peelite	William Monsell, later Baron Emly	Peelite
1850, 14 Dec	Wyndham Goold	Whig	William Monsell, later Baron Emly	Peelite
1854, Dec	Stephen de Vere	Whig	William Monsell, later Baron Emly	Peelite
1859, 16 May	Samuel Auchmuty Dickson	Conservative	William Monsell, later Baron Emly	Liberal
1865, 19 Jul	Edward John Synan	Liberal	William Monsell, later Baron Emly	Liberal
1874, 11 Feb	Edward John Synan	Home Rule	William Henry O'Sullivan	Home Rule
1885	Constituency divided: see East Limerick and West Limerick			

== Elections ==
=== Elections in the 1830s ===
Lloyd's death caused a by-election.

By-election, 2 February 1830: County Limerick
Party	Candidate	Votes	%	±%
Whig	Standish O'Grady	902	56.8	
Tory	James Hewitt Massy Dawson	687	43.2	
Majority		215	13.6	N/A
Turnout		1,589	50.6	
Registered electors		3,142		
Whig gain from Tory		Swing		

- On petition, O'Grady was unseated in favour of Massy Dawson.

General election 1830: County Limerick
Party	Candidate	Votes	%
Whig	Richard FitzGibbon, 3rd Earl of Clare	Unopposed	
Whig	Standish O'Grady	Unopposed	
Registered electors		3,142	
Whig hold			
Whig gain from Tory			

General election 1831: County Limerick
Party	Candidate	Votes	%
Whig	Richard FitzGibbon, 3rd Earl of Clare	Unopposed	
Whig	Standish O'Grady	Unopposed	
Whig hold			
Whig hold			

General election 1832: County Limerick
Party	Candidate	Votes	%
Whig	Richard FitzGibbon, 3rd Earl of Clare	1,056	29.3
Whig	Standish O'Grady	1,040	28.8
Repeal	Godfrey Massey	760	21.1
Repeal	Alexander McCarthy	751	20.8
Majority		280	7.7
Turnout		1,889	73.6
Registered electors		2,565	
Whig hold			
Whig hold			

General election 1835: County Limerick
Party	Candidate	Votes	%
Whig	Richard FitzGibbon, 3rd Earl of Clare	Unopposed	
Whig	William Smith O'Brien	Unopposed	
Registered electors		2,740	
Whig hold			
Whig hold			

General election 1837: County Limerick
Party	Candidate	Votes	%
Whig	Richard FitzGibbon, 3rd Earl of Clare	859	49.7
Whig	William Smith O'Brien	855	49.5
Conservative	Augustus Stafford O'Brien	14	0.8
Majority		841	48.7
Turnout		995	30.3
Registered electors		3,280	
Whig hold			
Whig hold			

=== Elections in the 1840s ===
General election 1841: County Limerick
Party	Candidate	Votes	%	±%
Whig	William Smith O'Brien	Unopposed		
Whig	Caleb Powell	Unopposed		
Registered electors		1,670		
Whig hold				
Whig hold				

General election 1847: County Limerick
Party	Candidate	Votes	%	±%
Peelite	William Monsell	588	30.3	N/A
Irish Confederate	William Smith O'Brien	482	24.9	New
Repeal	Caleb Powell	458	23.6	New
Repeal	George John O'Connell	407	21.0	New
Repeal	Patrick Carroll	4	0.2	New
Turnout		970 (est)	54.1 (est)	N/A
Registered electors		1,793		
Majority		130	6.7	N/A
Peelite gain from Whig		Swing	N/A	
Majority		24	1.3	N/A
Irish Confederate gain from Whig		Swing	N/A	

O'Brien was adjudged guilty of high treason, causing a by-election.

By-election, 1 June 1849: County Limerick
Party	Candidate	Votes	%	±%
Peelite	Samuel Dickson	Unopposed		
Peelite gain from Irish Confederate				

=== Elections in the 1850s ===
Dickson's death caused a by-election.

By-election, 14 December 1850: County Limerick
Party	Candidate	Votes	%	±%
Whig	Wyndham Goold	239	42.2	N/A
Conservative	Samuel Auchmuty Dickson	199	35.2	N/A
Tenant Right League	Michael Ryan	128	22.6	New
Majority		40	7.0	N/A
Turnout		566	31.6	−22.5
Registered electors		1,793		
Whig gain from Irish Confederate		Swing		

General election 1852: County Limerick
Party	Candidate	Votes	%	±%
Peelite	William Monsell	Unopposed		
Whig	Wyndham Goold	Unopposed		
Registered electors		5,079		
Peelite hold				
Whig gain from Irish Confederate				

Monsell was appointed a clerk of ordnance, requiring a by-election.

By-election, 12 January 1853: County Limerick
Party	Candidate	Votes	%	±%
Peelite	William Monsell	Unopposed		
Registered electors		6,249		
Peelite hold				

Goold's death caused a by-election.

By-election, 26 December 1854: County Limerick
Party	Candidate	Votes	%	±%
Whig	Stephen de Vere	Unopposed		
Whig hold				

Monsell was appointed President of the Board of Health, requiring a by-election.

By-election, 17 February 1857: County Limerick
Party	Candidate	Votes	%	±%
Peelite	William Monsell	Unopposed		
Registered electors		6,428		
Peelite hold				

General election 1857: County Limerick
Party	Candidate	Votes	%	±%
Peelite	William Monsell	Unopposed		
Whig	Stephen de Vere	Unopposed		
Registered electors		6,428		
Peelite hold				
Whig hold				

General election 1859: County Limerick
Party	Candidate	Votes	%	±%
Liberal	William Monsell	4,020	44.6	N/A
Conservative	Samuel Auchmuty Dickson	2,626	29.1	N/A
Liberal	Edward John Synan	2,369	26.3	N/A
Turnout		4,508 (est)	69.6 (est)	N/A
Registered electors		6,481		
Majority		1,394	15.5	N/A
Liberal hold		Swing	N/A	
Majority		257	2.8	N/A
Conservative gain from Liberal		Swing	N/A	

=== Elections in the 1860s ===
General election 1865: County Limerick
Party	Candidate	Votes	%	±%
Liberal	William Monsell	Unopposed		
Liberal	Edward John Synan	Unopposed		
Registered electors		6,318		
Liberal hold				
Liberal gain from Conservative				

Monsell was appointed Vice-President of the Board of Trade, requiring a by-election.

By-election, 1 March 1866: County Limerick
Party	Candidate	Votes	%	±%
Liberal	William Monsell	Unopposed		
Registered electors		6,318		
Liberal hold				

General election 1868: County Limerick
Party	Candidate	Votes	%	±%
Liberal	William Monsell	Unopposed		
Liberal	Edward John Synan	Unopposed		
Registered electors		6,571		
Liberal hold				
Liberal hold				

=== Elections in the 1870s ===
Monsell was appointed Postmaster General of the United Kingdom, requiring a by-election.

By-election, 28 Jan 1871: County Limerick
Party	Candidate	Votes	%	±%
Liberal	William Monsell	Unopposed		
Registered electors		6,489		
Liberal hold				

Monsell was created a peer in January 1874, voiding his seat, and a writ was to be issued for a by-election. However, this was pre-empted by the dissolution of Parliament later that month

General election 1874: County Limerick
Party	Candidate	Votes	%	±%
Home Rule	William Henry O'Sullivan	3,521	47.8	New
Home Rule	Edward John Synan	2,856	38.7	New
Home Rule	John James Kelly	995	13.5	New
Majority		1,861	25.2	N/A
Turnout		3,686 (est)	58.5 (est)	N/A
Registered electors		6,300		
Home Rule gain from Liberal				
Home Rule gain from Liberal				

=== Elections in the 1880s ===
General election 1880: County Limerick
Party	Candidate	Votes	%	±%
Home Rule	Edward John Synan	Unopposed		
Parnellite Home Rule League	William Henry O'Sullivan	Unopposed		
Registered electors		6,072		
Home Rule hold				
Home Rule hold				
