= Windham Quin =

Anglo-Irish politician

Windham Quin (1717 – May 1789) was an Anglo-Irish politician.

Quin sat in the Irish House of Commons as the Member of Parliament for Kilmallock between 1768 and 1776. He was the father of Valentine Quin, who was made a baronet in 1781 and Earl of Dunraven and Mount-Earl in 1822.

Parliament of Ireland
Preceded by Silver Oliver; Edward Villiers	Member of Parliament for Kilmallock; 1768–1776; With: Silver Oliver (1768–1769); Thomas Maunsell (1769–1776)	Succeeded by Silver Oliver; William Christmas
