= Samuel Dickson (died 1850) =

Irish Peelite politician (1776–1850)

Member of Parliament for County Limerick
- In office 11 August 1837 – 18 August 1847 Serving with William Monsell
- Preceded by: William Smith O'Brien; William Monsell
- Succeeded by: William Monsell; Wyndham Goold

Personal details
- Born: 1776
- Died: 28 October 1850 (aged 73–74)
- Party: Peelite

Samuel Dickson (1776 – 28 October 1850) was an Irish Peelite politician.

After unsuccessfully contesting Limerick City in 1830, Dickson was first elected MP for County Limerick at a by-election in 1849—caused by the removal of William Smith O'Brien who had been found guilty of high treason—but died in office the following year.

He was a member of the Union Club.

Parliament of the United Kingdom
Preceded by William Smith O'Brien; William Monsell	Member of Parliament for County Limerick; 1849–1850; With: William Monsell	Succeeded by William Monsell; Wyndham Goold
