= Clerk of the Ordnance =

Office of the Clerk of the Ordnance
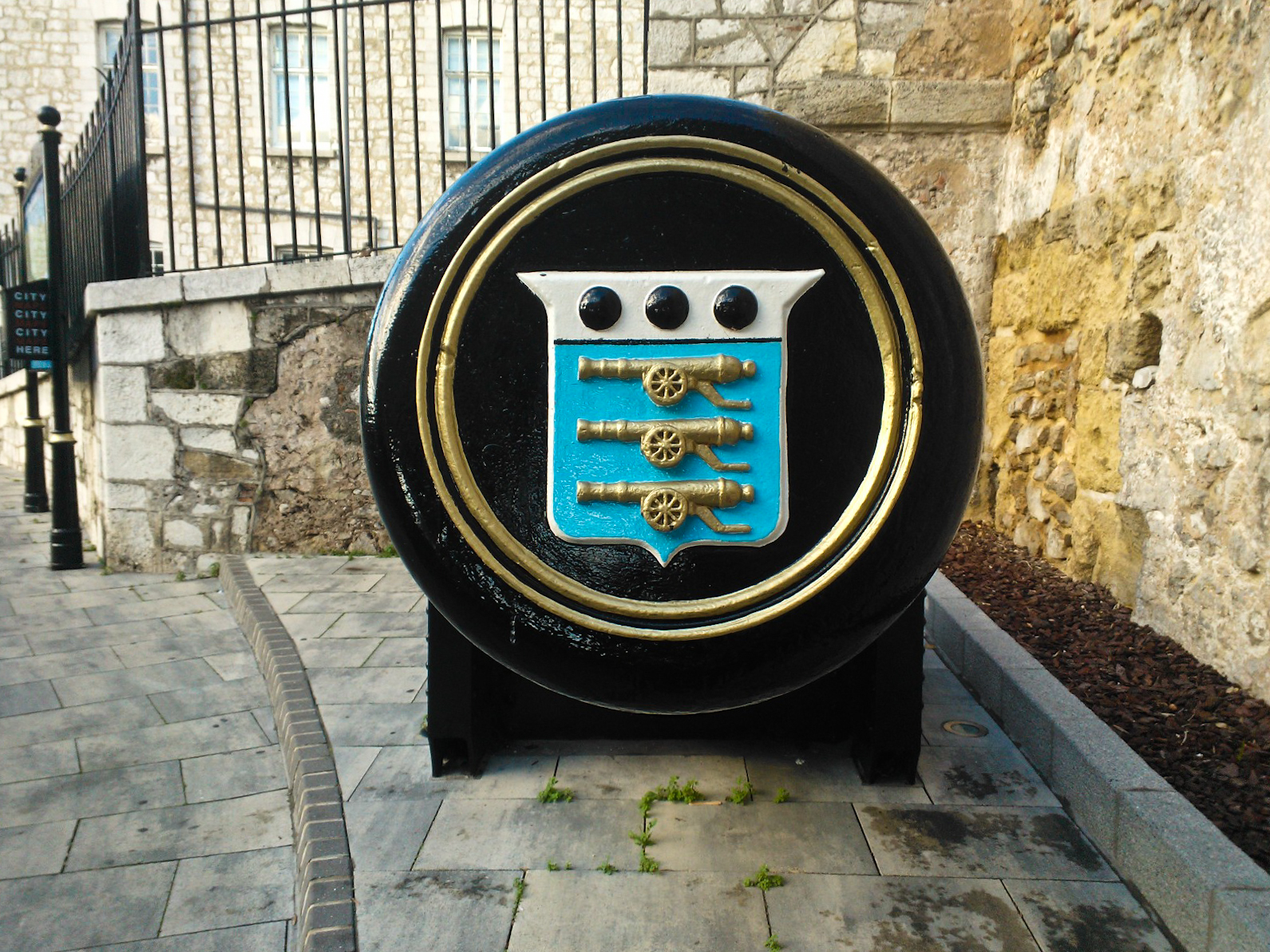
- Board of Ordnance Arms preserved on a gun tampion in Gibraltar
- Member of: Board of Ordnance (1545-1855)
- Reports to: Master-General of the Ordnance
- Appointer: Prime Minister; Subject to formal approval by the King-in-Council
- Term length: Not fixed (typically 3–9 years)
- Inaugural holder: John Rogers
- Formation: 1554-1857

The Clerk of the Ordnance was a subordinate of the Master-General of the Ordnance and a member of the Board of Ordnance from its constitution in 1597. He was responsible for the correspondence and for the financial bookkeeping of the Board. The office was abolished in 1857.

== Clerks of the Ordnance (pre-Restoration) ==
- 28 February 1554: John Rogers
- 9 February 1560: William Painter
- 21 June 1595: Sir Stephen Riddlesden (d. 1607)
- 18 July 1603: John Riddlesden (joint)
- 12 June 1623: Francis Morrice
- 30 September 1635: Edward Sherburne (Senior)
- December 1641: Edward Sherburne (junior)

== Clerks of the Ordnance (Parliamentary) ==
- bef. 1643: John White
- 1656: Lewis Audley
- bef. 1660: Thomas Nicholls

== Clerks of the Ordnance (post-Restoration) ==
- 1660: Edward Sherburne
- bef. 7 August 1689: John Swaddell
- 26 March 1690: Sir Thomas Littleton, 3rd Baronet
- 15 May 1696: Christopher Musgrave
- 2 December 1714: Edward Ashe
- 19 March 1718: Thomas White
- 31 May 1733: Leonard Smelt
- 19 December 1740: William Rawlinson Earle
- 8 December 1772: Sir Charles Cocks, 1st Baronet
- 13 May 1782: Gibbs Crawfurd
- 20 May 1783: Humphrey Minchin
- 1 March 1784: Gibbs Crawfurd
- 11 February 1794: John Sargent
- 30 June 1802: William Wellesley-Pole
- 22 February 1806: John Calcraft
- 7 April 1807: William Wellesley-Pole
- 29 July 1807: Cropley Ashley-Cooper
- 14 June 1811: Robert Ward
- 29 April 1823: Sir Henry Hardinge
- 18 May 1827: Sir George Clerk, 6th Baronet
- 4 September 1828: Spencer Perceval
- 13 December 1830: Charles Tennyson
- 16 February 1832: Thomas Francis Kennedy
- 4 December 1832: William Leader Maberly
- 30 June 1834: Sir Andrew Leith Hay
- 30 December 1834: Sir Edward Owen
- 25 April 1835: Sir Andrew Leith Hay
- 28 March 1838: James Whitley Deans Dundas
- 28 June 1841: George Anson
- 13 September 1841: Henry George Boldero
- 14 August 1845: Lord Arthur Lennox
- 14 July 1846: George Anson
- 4 March 1852: Francis Plunkett Dunne
- 15 January 1853: William Monsell
