= John Croker (politician) =

John Croker (1680–1751) was an Irish politician.

Croker was born in Ballynagarde, County Limerick and educated at Trinity College, Dublin. He was MP for Kilmallock in County Limerick from 1723 to 1727. He died on 6 November 1751.
