= John Waller (County Limerick MP) =

Irish politician

John Waller was an MP for Limerick in the Irish House of Commons between 1790 and 1801 and subsequently MP for Limerick in the UK House of Commons from 1801 to 1802.

== Early life ==
Waller was born in 1762 or 1765, the eldest son of John Thomas Waller, MP, of Castletown and Elizabeth Bolton of Clonrush, Queen's County. Waller was educated at Harrow 1775–6; and matriculated from Trinity, Dublin 17 Apr. 1779, aged 17. He was further educated at Lincoln's Inn 1783. He married Isabella Sarah Oliver, daughter of Silver Oliver, of Castle Oliver, and grandaunt of William Silver Oliver. Silver Oliver was MP for Limerick from 1768 to 1783. Waller was a descendant of Hardress Waller MP for County Limerick from 1639 to 1661. Waller was also Sheriff, Co. Limerick 1792–3.

== Political life ==
In 1798 Waller was returned to the Irish House of Commons for both County Limerick and Kilmallock and he chose to sit for County Limerick. Though he was known as an opponent of the Act of Union he was personally friendly with the main supporter of the Act, Lord Clare and the administration in Dublin Castle believed he was of their way of thinking. He was elected unopposed in 1801. In his brief period as MP there is no record of him taking his seat. He declined to stand in 1802 and the seat was taken by his brother-in-law Charles Silver Oliver.

== Later life ==
Little is known of Waller after he left politics other than he and Lady Waller traveled to France and in 1805 Waller was detained by the French at Verdun and refused to accept special treatment because of his acquaintance with General Arthur O'Connor and in 1806 Lady Waller died in France. It's possible Waller was a prisoner of war in Verdun as he was a captain in the 88th Foot as his own death notice mentioned. He died in 1836 and is buried in Castletown Graveyard.

Parliament of Ireland
| Preceded by Richard Philip Oliver; Sir Henry Hartstonge | Member of Parliament for County Limerick; 1798 – 1801; With: William Odell; William Massy (MP) 1798 | Succeeded by Parliament of the United Kingdom |
Parliament of the United Kingdom
| Preceded by NA | Member of Parliament for County Limerick 1801-1818; With: William Odell 1801–1802 | Succeeded by Charles Silver Oliver |
