= Edward John Synan =

Irish politician

Edward Synan (c. 1820 – 8 September 1887) was an Irish Home Rule League politician who served as a Member of Parliament (MP) for County Limerick from 1865 to 1885. He donated £6 to St Mary's Catholic Church, Pallaskenry.

Parliament of the United Kingdom
Preceded by Samuel Auchmuty Dickson; William Monsell	Member of Parliament for County Limerick; 1865–1885; With: William Monsell; William Henry O'Sullivan	constituency divided see East Limerick and West Limerick
