= William Bourke, 8th Baron Bourke of Connell =

Irish Jacobite peer (died c.1691)

The Right Honourable Lieutenant-Colonel The Lord Bourke of Castleconnell
- Uilleag de Búrca

Lord Lieutenant of Limerick
- In office 1689 – 1692
- Monarch: James II

Lord Lieutenant of the City of Limerick
- In office 1689 – 1691

Member of the Irish House of Lords
- Hereditary Peerage c.1680–c.1691
- Preceded by: Thomas Bourke
- Succeeded by: Forfeit

Personal details
- Born: William Bourke Ireland
- Died: c.1691 France
- Parents: Thomas Bourke; Margaret Hore
- Military career
- Allegiance: United Kingdom
- Branch: British Army
- Service years: 1689–1692
- Rank: Captain (1789); Lieutenant-Colonel (1691)
- Commands: Earl of Tyrone's Regiment of Foot; Sutherland's Regiment of Horse
- Conflicts: Battle of Aughrim (1691)

William Bourke, 8th Baron Bourke of Connell (died c.1691) was an Irish Jacobite peer.

== Background ==
Bourke was the son of Thomas Bourke, 7th Baron Bourke of Connell and Margaret Hore. He inherited his father's peerage in 1680. He was appointed Lord Lieutenant of Limerick and Lord Lieutenant of the City of Limerick by James II of England. During the Williamite War in Ireland, he was summoned to the Irish House of Lords in the brief Patriot Parliament called by James in 1689 and received a commission as a Captain in the Earl of Tyrone's Regiment of Foot. He later became a Lieutenant colonel in Sutherland's Regiment of Horse and fought at the Battle of Aughrim in 1691.

== Exile ==
Following the Jacobite defeat, Bourke followed James into exile in France and was attainted of his title and estates by the English government. He died in France in obscurity.

== Arms ==
Coat of arms of William Bourke, 8th Baron Bourke of Connell
Crest A Cat-a-Mountain sejant guardant proper, collared and chained Or. Escutcheon Or, a cross gules, in the first quarter a dexter hand couped at the wrist and erect sable. Supporters Two Cats-a-Mountain sejant guardant proper, collared and chained Or

== See also ==
- House of Burgh, an Anglo-Norman and Hiberno-Norman dynasty founded in 1193

Honorary titles
Preceded by	Lord Lieutenant of Limerick; 1689–1692	Succeeded by
Preceded by	Lord Lieutenant of the City of Limerick; 1689–1692	Succeeded by
Peerage of Ireland
Preceded by Thomas Bourke	Baron Bourke of Castleconnell; 1680–1691	Forfeit
