= William Henry O'Sullivan =

Irish politician

William Henry O'Sullivan MP
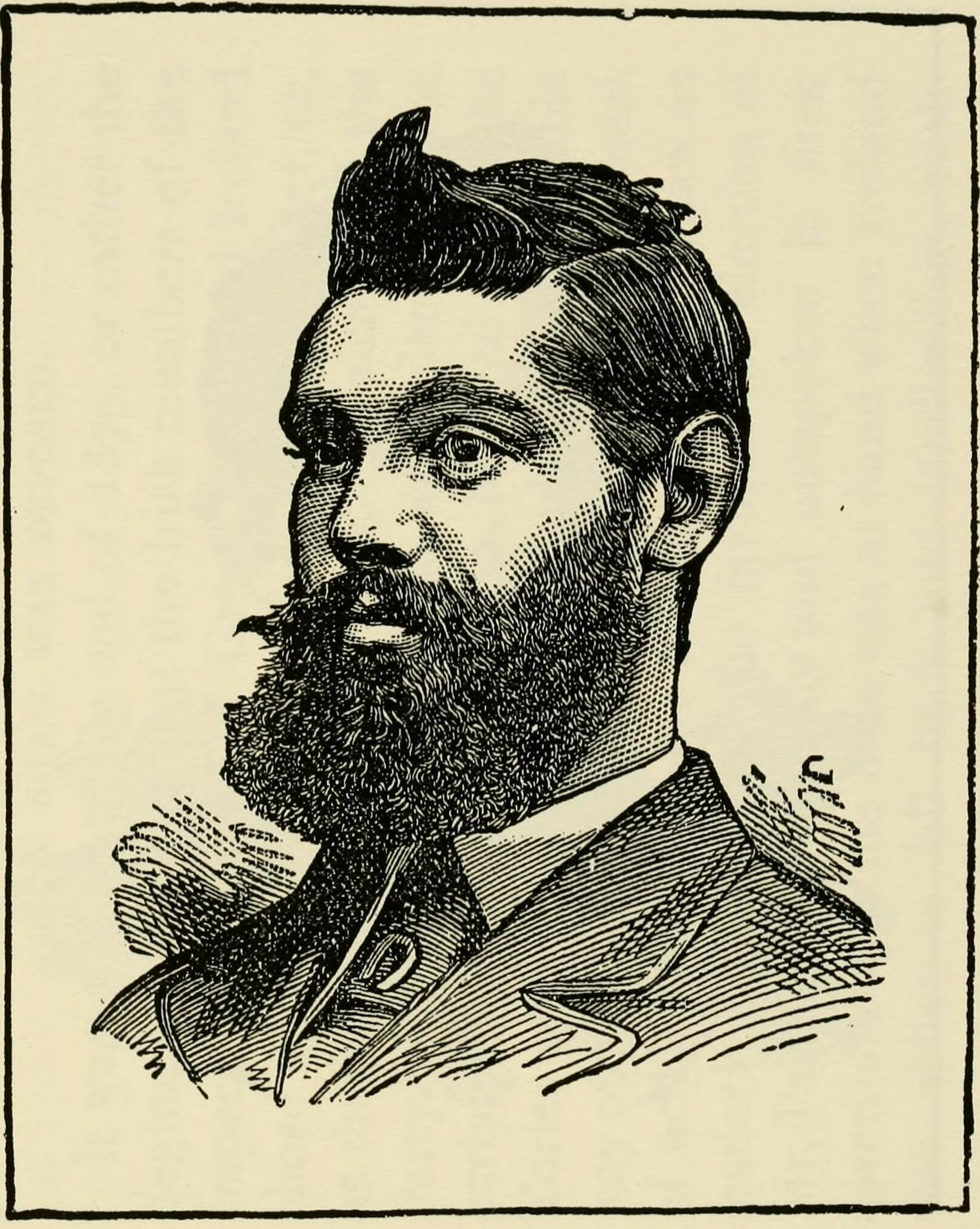
- Portrait of William Henry O'Sullivan

Member of Parliament for County Limerick
- In office 31 January 1874 – 24 November 1885 Serving with Edward John Synan
- Preceded by: Edward John Synan; William Monsell
- Succeeded by: Constituency abolished

Personal details
- Born: 1829
- Died: 27 April 1887 (aged 57)
- Party: Home Rule League

William Henry O'Sullivan (1829 – 27 April 1887) was an Irish Home Rule League politician.

He was elected as a Home Rule Member of Parliament (MP) for County Limerick in 1874 and held the seat until it was abolished in 1885.

Parliament of the United Kingdom
Preceded by Edward John Synan; William Monsell	Member of Parliament for County Limerick; 1874 – 1885; With: Edward John Synan	Constituency abolished
