= Stephen de Vere =

Anglo-Irish Member of Parliament

Sir Stephen De Vere Bt

High Sheriff of County Limerick
- In office 1870
- Preceded by: Edward William O'Brien of Cahermoyle
- Succeeded by: Desmond John Edmund FitzGerald, 26th Knight of Glin

Member of Parliament for County Limerick
- In office 1854–1859
- Preceded by: Wyndham Goold
- Succeeded by: Samuel Auchmuty Dickson

Personal details
- Born: 26 July 1812
- Died: 10 November 1904 (aged 92) Foynes, County Limerick, Ireland
- Resting place: Foynes, County Limerick, Ireland
- Party: Whig
- Relations: Sir Aubrey de Vere, 3rd Baronet; Mr Aubrey Thomas de Vere
- Parents: Sir Aubrey de Vere, 2nd Baronet (father); Mary Spring de Vere (née Rice) (mother)

Sir Stephen Edward De Vere, 4th Baronet (26 July 1812 – 10 November 1904) was an Anglo-Irish, Whig Party, Member of Parliament for County Limerick, who in the Famine year 1847 bore personal witness to the conditions aboard the "coffin ships" that carried Irish emigrants to North America, and who converted to Roman Catholicism.

== Biography ==
He was the second son of Sir Aubrey de Vere, 2nd Baronet and Mary Spring Rice, and elder brother of the poet Aubrey Thomas de Vere. He had three sisters, although only one, Elinor, survived until adulthood. De Vere's other siblings were; Horatio, William and Vere Edmond.

As the Great Famine developed from late 1845. de Vere assisted in the local administration of relief, and in the efforts of the Mansion House committee to lobby for greater government assistance. Like his uncle, Lord Monteagle, he had favoured assisted emigration, to British North America and the United States, as a solution for the congestion and poverty of rural Ireland. But, but such was the death toll aboard and in quarantine stations on arrival, that vessels carrying Irish emigrants across the Atlantic were acquiring a reputation as "coffin ships".

In the spring of 1847, de Vere took passage on an emigrant ship to Canada to investigate conditions for himself. His cousin Vere Foster took a similar passage to New York in 1850. De Vere composed a withering report on his voyage now contained within The Elgin-Grey Papers. When Colonial Secretary Earl Grey read this report, he forwarded it to Lord Elgin, Governor-General of Upper Canada and Lower Canada in the hope that these inhumane conditions could be improved. The Passenger Act 1847 (10 & 11 Vict. c. 103) made "coffin ships" illegal, though many still operated.

On arrival in Montreal in 1847, de Vere was received into the Roman Catholic church, a conversion attributed to his "admiration for the moral fortitude in hardship of the catholic peasantry". He subsequently defended the re-creation of the English Catholic hierarchy in 1851.

In December 1854 he was returned to Westminster unopposed as the Member of Parliament for County Limerick, holding the seat until he chose to step down at the general election of 1859. Broadly Whig or Liberal in allegiance, with other MPs loosely aligned in the Commons as the Independent Irish Party, he took the pledge of the Tenant Right League to maintain an independent opposition, and not accept government office or favour, until legislation was secured giving statutory authority across Ireland to tenant right--the "Ulster Custom".

In the 1860s and 1870s he was agent for the family estate and fulfilled the traditional role of the gentry at sessions, assizes, and meetings of boards of guardians. He was made High Sheriff of County Limerick in 1870. He welcomed Gladstone's Land Law (Ireland) Act 1881, but did not follow the Liberal leader in embracing the cause of Irish Home Rule.

Stephen Edward became 4th Baronet De Vere of Curragh in 1880 when his oldest brother, Vere Edmond, the 3rd Baronet, died with no male heir. With the title, Stephen inherited the Curraghchase Forest Park estate, in County Limerick. Before becoming the 4th Baronet, Stephen had built a smaller house in the 1850s on Foynes Island in the River Shannon, adjacent to the port town of Foynes, less than 20 km (12 mi) from Curraghchase. There he wrote poems, political pamphlets and translated several editions of the works of Horace, considered by some as the best English translation of Horace's verses.

He built a Gothic church in Foynes, and is buried beside it. On his death in 1904 the baronetcy became extinct. He never married and his estate, together with that of his unmarried brother Aubrey, went to their nephew Aubrey Vere O'Brien, while the Foynes Island farm went to their other nephew, Robert Vere O'Brien.

Parliament of the United Kingdom
Preceded by Wyndham Goold	Member of Parliament for County Limerick; 1854–1859	Succeeded by Samuel Auchmuty Dickson
Baronetage of Ireland
Preceded by Vere Edmond de Vere	Baronet (of Curragh); 1880–1904	Extinct
