= Baron Emly =

Title in the Peerage of the United Kingdom

Baron Emly, of Tervoe in the County of Limerick, was a title in the Peerage of the United Kingdom. It was created on 12 January 1874 for the Liberal politician William Monsell. He had previously served as President of the Board of Health, Paymaster General and Postmaster General. He was succeeded by his only son from his second marriage, the second Baron. He had no surviving male issue and consequently the title became extinct on his death on 24 November 1932.

== Barons Emly (1874) ==
- William Monsell, 1st Baron Emly (1812–1894)
- Thomas William Gaston Monsell, 2nd Baron Emly (1858–1932)

== Arms ==
Coat of arms of Baron Emly
Notes Confirmed 18 December 1873 by Sir John Bernard Burke, Ulster King of Arms. Crest A lion rampant Proper holding between his paws a mullet Sable. Escutcheon Argent on a chevron between three mullets Sable a trefoil slipped Or. Motto Mone Sale
