= Kilmallock (Parliament of Ireland constituency) =

Pre-1801 Irish constituency

- Former borough constituency for the Irish House of Commons
- County: County Limerick
- Borough: Kilmallock

–1801
- Replaced by: Disfranchised

Kilmallock was a constituency represented in the Irish House of Commons until 1800.

== History ==
In the Patriot Parliament of 1689 summoned by James II, Kilmallock was represented with two members.

== Members of Parliament ==
Election	First MP	Second MP
1585	John Verdon	Thomas Hurley
1613	Henry Verdon	Patrick Kearney
1634	John Fox	Simon Haly
1639	Sir William St Leger	John Power
1661	John Bridges (died 1665)	Brook Bridges
1665	Murrough Boyle	Brook Bridges
1689	Sir William Hurly, 3rd Bt	John Lacy
1692	John Ormsby	Robert Ormsby
1695	Standish Hartstonge (Note: Succeeded as 2nd Baronet in 1697)	Chidley Coote
1703	John Ormsby	Robert Oliver
1713	Sir Philips Coote	Henry Boyle
1715	Kilner Brasier	George King
1723	Kilner Brasier	John Croker
1725	William Blakeney	John Croker
1727	William Blakeney	Robert Oliver
1739	William Blakeney	Robert Oliver
1745	William Blakeney	Philip Oliver
1757	Silver Oliver (Note: Also elected for County Limerick in 1768, for which he chose to sit)	Philip Oliver
1761	Silver Oliver	Edward Villiers
1768	Silver Oliver	Windham Quin
1769	Thomas Maunsell	Windham Quin
1776	Silver Oliver (Note: Also elected for County Limerick in 1776, for which he chose to sit)	William Christmas
1777	John Finlay	William Christmas
1783	John FitzGibbon	John Armstrong
January 1790	Charles Bury	John Armstrong
May 1790	Peter Holmes	John Armstrong
1792	Peter Holmes	Charles Bury
January 1798	John Waller (Note: Also elected for County Limerick in 1798, for which he chose to sit)	Silver Oliver
1798	Charles Silver Oliver	Silver Oliver
1799	Charles Silver Oliver	Sir Valentine Quin, Bt
1800	Thomas Casey	Sir Valentine Quin, Bt
1801	Disenfranchised	

== Bibliography ==
- O'Hart, John (2007). The Irish and Anglo-Irish Landed Gentry: When Cromwell came to Ireland. Vol. II. Heritage Books. ISBN 0-7884-1927-7.
- Leigh Rayment's historical List of Members of the Irish House of Commons. Cites: Johnston-Liik, Edith Mary (2002). The History of the Irish Parliament 1692-1800 (6 volumes). Ulster Historical Foundation.
