= John FitzGibbon, 2nd Earl of Clare =

Irish aristocrat and politician

The Right Honourable The Earl of Clare KP GCH PC
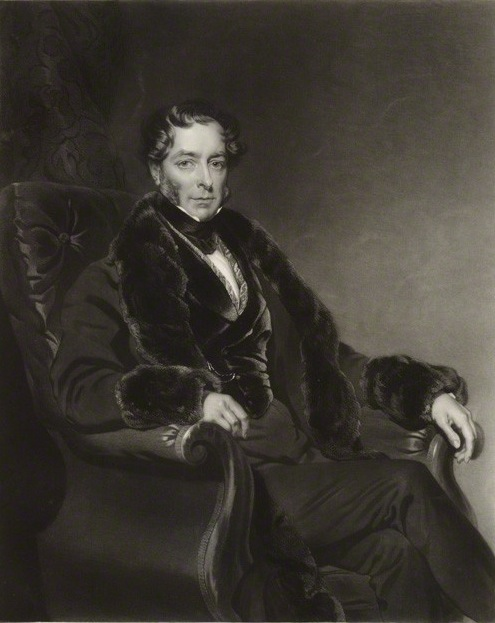

Governor of Bombay
- In office 1831–1835
- Preceded by: John Romer
- Succeeded by: Sir Robert Grant

Personal details
- Born: 10 July 1792
- Died: 18 August 1851 (aged 59)
- Spouse: Hon. Elizabeth Burrell (m. 1826)
- Relations: Thomas Whaley (uncle)
- Parent(s): John FitzGibbon, 1st Earl of Clare; Anne Whaley
- Education: Harrow School; Christ Church, Oxford

John FitzGibbon, 2nd Earl of Clare KP GCH PC (10 July 1792 – 18 August 1851) was an Anglo Irish aristocrat and politician.

== Early life ==
FitzGibbon was born on 10 July 1792. He was the eldest son of John FitzGibbon, 1st Earl of Clare and his wife, the former Anne Whaley. He had two siblings, the Hon. Richard Hobart FitzGibbon (who later became the 3rd Earl of Clare), and Lady Isabella Mary Anne FitzGibbon.

His maternal grandparents were Richard Chapel Whaley, of Whaley Abbey in County Wicklow, and the former Anne Ward (daughter of Rev. Bernard Ward). His uncle was Thomas Whaley, a Member of Parliament for Newcastle. His father was the second, but first surviving son, and heir, of John FitzGibbon, of Mount Shannon in County Limerick and Eleanor (née Grove) FitzGibbon (daughter of John Grove, of Ballyhimmock, in County Cork).

Upon his father's death in 1802, he succeeded to the titles of Baron FitzGibbon in the Peerage of Great Britain and Earl of Clare in the Irish Peerage. He was educated at Harrow School and Christ Church, Oxford, graduating in 1812.

== Career ==
From 1820 to 1851, he was active in estate management when not in public office, and from 1820 onwards was active in the House of Lords. In 1830 he became a Privy Councillor, and later the same year was appointed Governor of Bombay, serving until 1835.

In 1835 he was invested as a Knight Grand Cross of the Royal Guelphic Order, was a member of the Royal Asiatic Society from 1839 and invested as a Knight of St Patrick in 1845. He was Deputy Lieutenant of the County of Limerick from 1846 to 1849 and afterwards Lord Lieutenant of the City of Limerick for the remainder of his life.

== Personal life ==
On 14 April 1826, he married the Hon. Elizabeth Burrell, daughter of Peter Burrell, 1st Lord Gwydwyr and Priscilla Bertie, suo jure 21st Baroness Willoughby de Eresby. Her dowry was between £30,000 and £60,000. The couple lived apart, Lady Clare moving to the Isle of Wight where she built a Catholic church at Ryde and a Priory at Carisbrooke.

He was also known to have been a great friend of Lord Byron while attending Harrow School. Byron had claimed to love him "ad infinitum" and said that he could never hear the word "Clare" without "a murmur of the heart".

Lord Clare died on 18 August 1851 and, as he had no issue, was succeeded in his titles and estates by his younger brother. His remains are deposited in Catacomb B, Vault 63, in Kensal Green Cemetery, London where his cap of maintenance may be seen inside the vault. His widow was buried at Mountjoy Cemetery in Carisbrooke, Isle of Wight, next to her close companion Miss Charlotte Elliot.

== Coat of arms ==
Coat of arms of John FitzGibbon, 2nd Earl of Clare
Coronet A coronet of an Earl Crest A boar passant azure tusked and bristled or. Escutcheon Ermine a saltire gules on a chief or, three annulets of the second. Supporters Dexter: a lion or; Sinister: a tiger or. Motto Nil admirari. Marvel at nothing.

Political offices
Preceded by John Romer	Governor of Bombay; 1831–1835	Succeeded by Sir Robert Grant
Honorary titles
Preceded by Hon. Richard FitzGibbon	Lord Lieutenant of Limerick; 1848–1851	Succeeded by The Earl of Clare
Peerage of Ireland
Preceded by John FitzGibbon	Earl of Clare; 1802–1851	Succeeded by Richard FitzGibbon
