= Sam Dixon =

Sam or Samuel Dixon may refer to:

- Sam Dixon (humanitarian) (died 2010), Methodist charity executive who died in the 2010 Haiti earthquake
- Sam Dixon (basketball) (born 1957), high school basketball coach
- Samantha Dixon, British Labour Party politician
- Samuel Dixon, Australian songwriter, producer and musician
- Samuel Dixon (artist) (died 1769), Irish artist
- Samuel Dixon (West Virginia businessman) (1856–1934), industrialist and politician in West Virginia
- Samuel Gibson Dixon (1851–1918), American physician and bacteriologist
- Samuel Dixon, principal of Bohemia Manor High School, 1958–1960

== See also ==
- Samuel Dickson (disambiguation)
