= Catherine Maria Bury =

Irish socialite

- Born: Catherine Maria Dawson; 22 December 1762
- Died: 24 February 1851 (aged 88)
- Spouses: James Tisdall (m. 1787; died 1797) Charles Bury, 1st Earl of Charleville (m. 1798; died 1835)
- Children: 3

Catherine Maria Bury, countess of Charleville (née Dawson; 22 December 1762 – 24 February 1851) was an Irish socialite. She is credited with quietly playing a role in the architecture of Charleville Castle. A letter writer, she is also known for her association with literary circles.

== Biography ==
Catherine Maria Dawson was the only daughter of Thomas Townley Dawson of Armagh and Joanna Saunders of County Wicklow. She was raised in Dublin by her grandmother and studied at the College Royal, Toulouse.

In 1787, she married her first husband James Tisdall of Bawn, County Louth, with whom she had a son and a daughter. Tisdall died of epilepsy ten years later. In 1798, she married her second husband Charles Bury, Baron Tullamore, with whom she had one son. Charles became Viscount Charleville in 1800 and the 1st Earl of Charleville in 1806.

Catherine was a social woman active in gothic literary circles, befriending writers including Joanna Baillie, Byron and Caroline Lamb. She wrote one poem "Thelema and Macarius", which was published in the collection The Casket, a Miscellany, Consisting of Unpublished Poems (1829). She was reportedly "an invalid for many years".

=== Architecture ===
The first sign of Catherine's interest in architecture is a drawing titled Elevation of proposed Royal infirmary, Dublin signed Catherine M. Dawson and dated 1796. Correspondence with her friend Lady Louisa Conolly suggests Catherine downplayed or omitted her own involvement in the design of Charleville Castle near Tullamore, even crediting her husband with having "planned it all himself". However, the diary of Robert Day reported that it was Lady Charleville who was working with Francis Johnston on the design in 1812, while several surviving papers of the castle's architectural sketches are signed by and attributed to Catherine.

== Legacy ==
Her papers are housed in the University of Nottingham.
