= Lord Lieutenant of the City of Limerick =

Representative of the British monarch in the City of Limerick

This is an incomplete list of people who have served as Lord-Lieutenant of City of Limerick.

- William Bourke, 8th Baron Bourke of Connell: 1689–1691 (died 1691)
- William Monsell, 1st Baron Emly of Tervoe –1894
- Windham Thomas Wyndham-Quin, 4th Earl of Dunraven and Mount-Earl 1895–1922
