= Lord Lieutenant of Limerick =

Representative of the British monarch in County Limerick

This is a list of people who have served as Lord Lieutenant of Limerick.

There were lieutenants of counties in Ireland until the reign of James II, when they were renamed governors. The office of Lord Lieutenant was recreated on 23 August 1831. The title Lord Lieutenant was always pronounced as 'Lord Lef-tenant'.

== Governors ==
- William Bourke, 8th Baron Bourke of Connell: 1689–1691 (died 1691)
- Thomas Southwell, 1st Viscount Southwell: 1762– (died 1780)
- Robert Deane, 1st Baron Muskerry: 1780–1818
- Richard FitzGibbon: 1818–1831

== Lord Lieutenants ==
- Richard FitzGibbon (who later became, in 1851, 3rd Earl of Clare): 7 October 1831 – September 1848
- John FitzGibbon, 2nd Earl of Clare: 13 September 1848 – 13 August 1851
- Richard FitzGibbon, 3rd Earl of Clare: 1851 – 10 January 1864
- Edwin Wyndham-Quin, 3rd Earl of Dunraven and Mount-Earl: 20 February 1864 – 6 October 1871
- William Monsell, 1st Baron Emly: 8 December 1871 – 20 April 1894
- Thomas Enraght O'Brien: 29 November 1894 – 18 January 1896
- Windham Wyndham-Quin, 4th Earl of Dunraven and Mount-Earl: 5 March 1896 – 1922
