= Standish O'Grady, 2nd Viscount Guillamore =

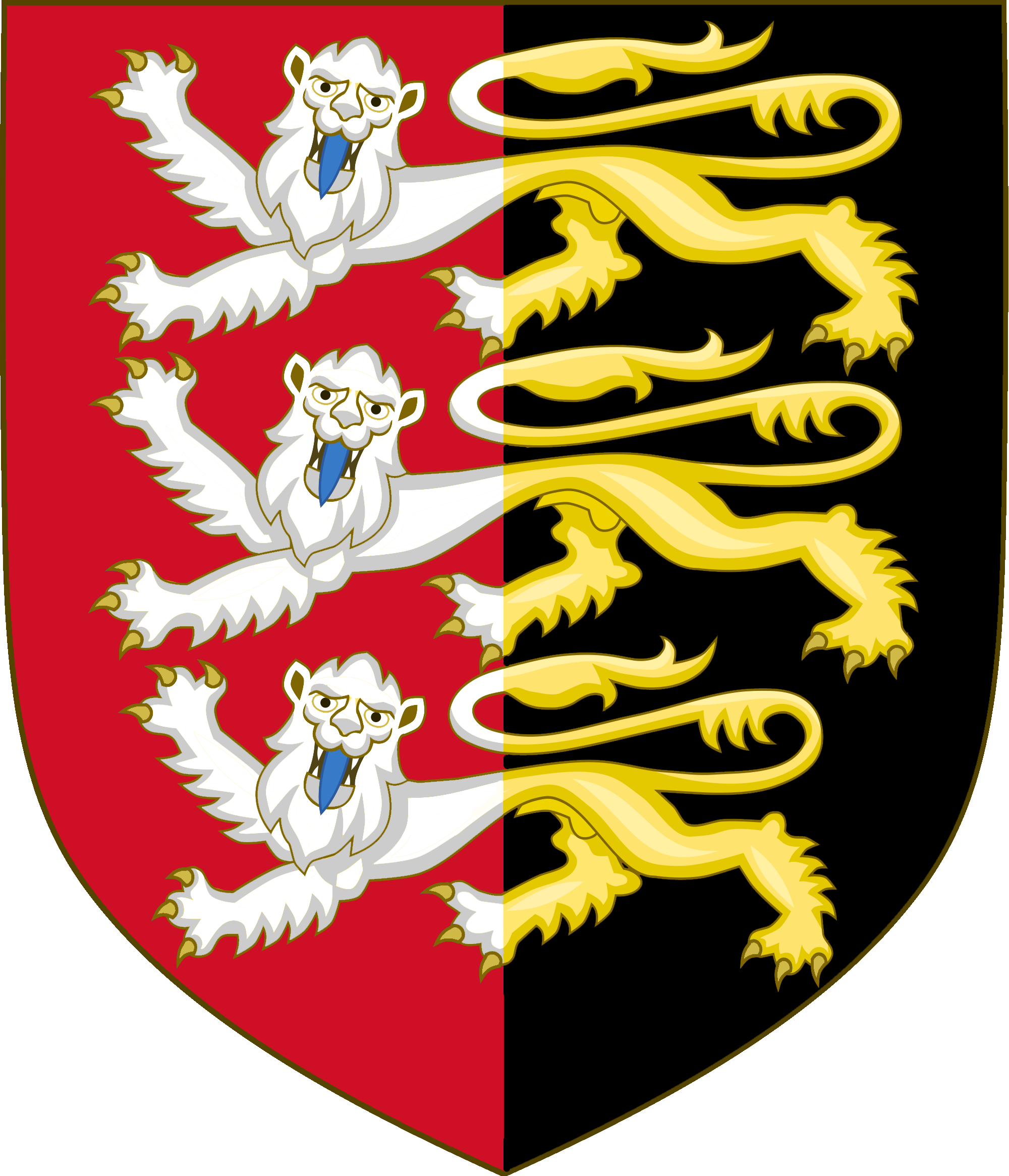
Arms of O'Grady: Per pale gules and sable, three lions passant guardant in pale per pale argent and or

Colonel Standish Darby O'Grady, 2nd Viscount Guillamore (26 December 1792 – 22 July 1848) from Cahir Guillamore, County Limerick, was an Anglo-Irish politician and British Army officer.

== Biography ==
O'Grady was born on 26 December 1792, the eldest son of Standish O'Grady, 1st Viscount Guillamore, and Katherine, daughter of John Thomas Waller of Castletown. He was educated at Westminster School by 1809; and Trinity College, Dublin (1809).

=== Military career ===
O'Grady was commissioned into the British army as an ensign in the 7th Hussars in 1811. Promoted to lieutenant in 1812, he fought in the Waterloo Campaign in the 7th Hussars. On 17 June 1815, he had command of the troop of the 7th Hussars on the high road from Genappe to Quatre Bras and was involved in the action at Genappe. The regiment was covering the British march from Quatre Bras to Waterloo. Sir William Dörnberg left O'Grady outside the town on the Quatre Bras road to hold in check the advancing French cavalry while the main body of the regiment proceeded in file across the narrow bridge of Genappe and up the steep street of the town. O'Grady advanced at the head of his troops as soon as the French appeared, and presented so bold a front that, after a time, they retired. When they were out of sight, he crossed the bridge at the entrance of Genappe. He took his troop at a gallop through the town, rejoining Sir William Dörnberg, who had drawn up the main body of the regiment on the sloping road at the Waterloo end of Genappe. A severe cavalry combat ensued when the French lancers reached the top of the town, in which O'Grady's regiment made a gallant charge, with considerable loss.

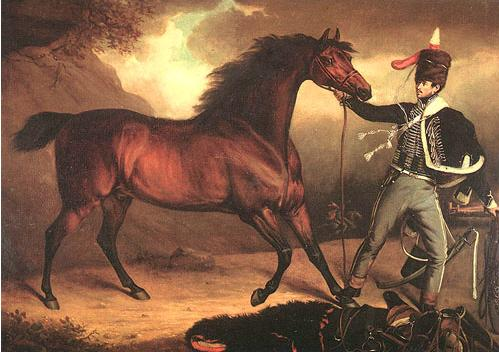
Anonymous painting of a 7th Queen's Royal Hussar private during the Napoleonic wars.

The next day at the Battle of Waterloo he was stationed on the ground above Hougoumont on the British right. He wrote in a letter to his father just after the battle:

The 7th had an opportunity of showing what they could do if they got fair play. We charged twelve or fourteen times, and once cut off a squadron of cuirassiers, every man of whom we killed on the spot except the two officers and one Marshal de Logis, whom I sent to the rear.

Two letters of his to Captain William Siborne, describing the movements of his regiments on 17 and 18 June 1815, are printed in Waterloo Letters, edited by Major-General H. T. Siborne (London, 1891, pp. 130–6). His military career continued in fits and starts. After Waterloo, he was promoted to captain, but was put into the reserves ("on half-pay") the next year, probably because his father wanted him to enter politics. However, he failed to get into parliament and went back on active service as a captain in the 18th Dragoons in 1819. After his election to parliament, he was again placed in the reserves in 1821. In 1825, still in the reserves, he was promoted to major. He was placed on active service with the 24th Foot from 1828 until 1829 when he was again placed in the reserves. In 1842 he was promoted to Colonel and became aide-de-camp to Queen Victoria the same year—a post he held until he died.

=== Political career ===
He was defeated on his first attempt in 1818 but was elected in 1820 as Member of Parliament for County Limerick, and held the seat until 1826. His early period in Parliament was dominated by controversy over a parliamentary inquiry into his father's conduct as a judge. James Grattan emerged as an opponent of O'Grady in this issue and it is known they fought a duel in July 1822. O'Grady was a vigorous defender of the rights of his constituents and in 1823 on behalf of Limerick Corporation, he opposed a plan by Spring Rice the MP for Limerick City to reform the borough. In 1825 he voted to suppress the Catholic Association and later the same year he refused to attend a meeting in Limerick that supported Catholic Emancipation, both these made him unpopular amongst his Catholic constituents. He was defeated in the 1826 election. Though there was a movement to have him appointed as High Sheriff of County Limerick it was ignored because after his defeat O'Grady rejoined the army in the 24th Foot which were stationed in Limerick at that time.

After the death of Thomas Lloyd in 1829, O'Grady was again returned for County Limerick on 2 February 1830, this time with the support of Daniel O'Connell. His support was firm with his Catholic constituents by this stage but on 3 May his name was struck from the electoral return and replaced with that of James Dawson, previously the MP for Clonmel. O'Grady was returned unopposed later that year in the general election. Despite a strong challenge by a Repeal candidate in the 1832 general election he was again returned. In the 1835 election he retired and was replaced by William Smith O'Brien.

=== Later life ===
He succeeded to the peerage as Viscount Guillamore on 21 April 1840 on the death of his father, the 1st Viscount.

O'Grady died suddenly in Dublin on 22 July 1848.

== Family ==
On 16 October 1828, he married Gertrude-Jane (died 1871), daughter of Berkeley Paget and Sophia Bucknall. Among their children were:

- Honourable Sophia O'Grady (b.1829), who married in 1862 Edward Wilmot Williams, JP, DL (b1826), an officer in the Begal Cavalry
- Honourable Gertrude O'Grady (b.1831), who married in 1855 Colonel Thomas C. Norbury, CB (d.1899), and left issue
- Standish (1832–1860), third Viscount Guillamore, who left a daughter:
  - Honourable Cecilia O'Grady (b.1855), who married in 1877 Edward Roche, 2nd Baron Fermoy (1850–1920)
- Honourable Kathleen Elanor Henrietta O'Grady (b.1834), who married in 1855 James H. August Steuart (d.1895)
- Paget Standish (1835–1877) fourth Viscount Guillamore
- Honourable Reginald Grimston Standish O'Grady (d.1874), who married in 1867 Frances Arabella Beresford, daughter of Rt Hon. William Beresford
- Hardress Standish (1841–1918) fifth Viscount Guillamore, unmarried
- Honourable Annabel O'Grady (b.1843), who married in 1873 Hugh Melvil Freeling (d.1906), of the Freeling baronets (a grandson of the 1st Baronet)
- Frederick Standish (1847–1927) sixth Viscount Guillamore, who married in 1881 Mary Theresa Burdett Coventry, daughter of Hon. William James Coventry, who was son of George Coventry, 7th Earl of Coventry

== Notes ==
Parliament of the United Kingdom
Preceded by Windham Quin, Lord Adare and Richard FitzGibbon	Member of Parliament for County Limerick; 1820 – 1826; With: Richard FitzGibbon	Succeeded by Richard FitzGibbon and Thomas Lloyd
Preceded by Richard FitzGibbon and Thomas Lloyd	Member of Parliament for County Limerick; 1830; With: Richard FitzGibbon	Succeeded by Richard FitzGibbon and James Dawson
Preceded by Richard FitzGibbon and James Dawson	Member of Parliament for County Limerick; 1830 – 1835; With: Richard FitzGibbon	Succeeded by Richard FitzGibbon and William Smith O'Brien
Peerage of Ireland
Preceded by Standish O'Grady	Viscount Guillamore; 1840 – 1848	Succeeded by Standish O'Grady
