= Samuel Auchmuty Dickson =

Irish Conservative politician

Member of Parliament for County Limerick
- In office 16 May 1859 – 19 July 1865 Serving with William Monsell
- Preceded by: Stephen de Vere; William Monsell
- Succeeded by: William Monsell; Edward John Synan

Personal details
- Born: c. 1817
- Died: 1870 (aged 52–53)
- Party: Conservative

Coat of arms of Samuel Auchmuty Dickson

Notes
Confirmed 8 January 1855 by Sir John Bernard Burke, Ulster King of Arms.
Crest
Out of battlements a naked arm embowed holding a sword all Proper.
Escutcheon
Azure a crescent between three mullets Argent on a chief Or as many pallets Gules.
Motto
Fortes Fortuna Juvat

Samuel Auchmuty Dickson (c. 1817 – 1870) was an Irish Conservative politician.

Dickson was the grandson of Samuel Dickson of Ballinaguile, Croagh, Co Limerick. His father was Major General William Dickson who married Harriet Dallas in 1816. Samuel was born in Madras in 1817, where his father was in the army. Samuel entered the army as an ensign in the 32nd Ft in 1835. He became a lieutenant in 1839 and was a lieutenant colonel by 1854. Dickson made several unsuccessful attempts to be elected for parliament—at County Limerick in 1850, Reading in 1852, and Kingston upon Hull in 1854—before he won at County Limerick at the 1859 general election where he beat Edward John Synan. He held the seat until 1865, when he did not seek re-election. In 1855 the Chief Herald of Ireland granted him a confirmation of arms through his grandfather.

Parliament of the United Kingdom
Preceded by Stephen de Vere; William Monsell	Member of Parliament for County Limerick; 1859–1865; With: William Monsell	Succeeded by William Monsell; Edward John Synan
