= Thomas Enraght O'Brien =

Thomas Enraght O'Brien (4 May 1827 – 18 January 1896) was Lord Lieutenant of Limerick and Custos Rotulorum of Limerick between 29 November 1894 until his death. He left an estate worth over £30,000. He was married to Harriet O'Brien (née O'Neill). He is buried in Mount Saint Lawrence Cemetery, Limerick.

He was appointed to the Commission of the Peace for South Hill, Limerick, in 1879, and was appointed to serve as Lieutenant and Custos Rotulorum for County Limerick in December 1894.

Outside of government appointments, he was a partner in the Limerick grocers, John Quin & Co., Ltd. He was said to have been a philanthropist, and to have served as a governor on the Lunatic Asylum Board.
