= John Romer (politician) =

Governor of Bombay

John Romer (c. 1771 – 22 August 1858) was a British colonial administrator in the East India Company who was officiating Governor of Bombay during the British Raj from 17 January 1831 to 21 March 1831.

He died in London, aged 77.

Political offices
Preceded by Sir Thomas Sidney Beckwith	Governor of Bombay; 1831	Succeeded by John FitzGibbon, 2nd Earl of Clare
