= Silver Oliver (died 1798) =

Irish landowner and politician

The Right Honourable Silver Oliver PC

Member of the Irish House of Commons for County Limerick
- In office 1768–1776 Serving with Hugh Massy
- Preceded by: Hon. Thomas Arthur Southwell; Hugh Massy
- Succeeded by: Hon. Hugh Massy; Sir Henry Hartstonge, Bt

High Sheriff of County Limerick
- In office 1764–1764
- Preceded by: Thomas Royse
- Succeeded by: Hugh Massy, 2nd Baron Massy

Member of the Irish House of Commons for Kilmallock
- In office 1757–1768 Serving with Philip Oliver, Edward Villiers, Windham Quin
- Preceded by: William Blakeney; Philip Oliver
- Succeeded by: Thomas Maunsell; Windham Quin

Personal details
- Born: 1736
- Died: 21 November 1798 (aged 61–62)
- Spouse: Isabella Sarah Newman (m. 1759; died 1777)
- Parent(s): Robert Oliver; Jane Katherine Silver Oliver

The Rt. Hon. Silver Oliver PC (1736 – 21 November 1798) was an Irish landowner and Privy Counsellor politician who owned Castle Oliver in County Limerick, Ireland.

== Early life ==
He was the son of Jane Katherine (née Silver) Oliver and Robert Oliver, who also sat in the Irish House of Commons for Kilmallock.

His paternal grandfather was Robert Oliver (son of Charles Oliver who lived at Clonodfoy, County Limerick) and was also an Irish MP for Kilmallock and County Limerick.

== Career ==
He held the office of Member of Parliament for Kilmallock in 1757. He held the office of High Sheriff of County Limerick in 1764. He held the office of Member of Parliament for County Limerick in 1768, serving until 1776. In 1769, he was appointed Privy Councillor.

== Personal life ==
On 4 February 1759, Oliver was married to Isabella Sarah Newman (d. 1777), a daughter of Richard Newman. Together, they lived at Castle Oliver in County Limerick, Ireland. They were the parents of:

- Samual Oliver (c. 1759–1769), who died young.
- Katherine Oliver (c. 1761–1818), who married Henry Sandford, 1st Baron Mount Sandford, MP for the borough of Roscommon (and grandson of Stephen Moore, 1st Viscount Mountcashell), in 1780.
- Richard Philip Oliver-Gascoigne (1762–1843), who married Mary Turner, daughter of Sir Charles Turner, 1st Baronet and step-daughter and heiress of Sir Thomas Gascoigne, 8th Baronet.
- Charles Silver Oliver (1763–1817), who married Maria Elizabeth Morris, daughter of banker Abraham Morris, in 1805.
- Jane Oliver (c. 1764), who married Rev. William Sandford, son of Henry Sandford; their son succeeded as the 2nd Baron Mount Sandford.
- Silver Oliver (1770–1834), MP for Kilmallock in 1797 who died unmarried.
- Susanna Oliver (c. 1766–1857), who married Rev. Hans Hamilton, rector of Knocktopher and a son of Rt. Rev. Hugh Hamilton, in 1801.
- Isabella Sarah Oliver (b. c. 1768), who married John Waller of Castletown, son of John Thomas Waller.
- Elizabeth Oliver (b. c. 1772), who died unmarried.
- Robert Oliver (c. 1774–1834), who married Sarah Shepley (née Barker) Sotheran, widow of William Sotheran and daughter of Edmund Barker, in 1809.

Oliver died on 21 November 1798.

Parliament of Ireland
Preceded by Hon. Thomas Arthur Southwell; Hugh Massy	Member of Parliament for County Limerick; 1768–1776; With: Hugh Massy	Succeeded by Hon. Hugh Massy; Sir Henry Hartstonge, Bt
Preceded by William Blakeney; Philip Oliver	Member of Parliament for Kilmallock; 1757–1768; With: Philip Oliver, Edward Villiers, Windham Quin	Succeeded by Thomas Maunsell; Windham Quin
