= Wyndham Goold =

Wyndham Goold (1812–1854) was a Member of Parliament (MP) for County Limerick from 1850 to 1854.

Goold was educated at Westminster School and Trinity College, Dublin. He was the son of Frederick Falkiner Goold, Archdeacon of Raphoe and Caroline Newcomen, and brother in law of Bishop Hamilton Verschoyle
