= William Smith O'Brien =

Irish nationalist politician (1803–1864)

The Hon. William Smith O'Brien
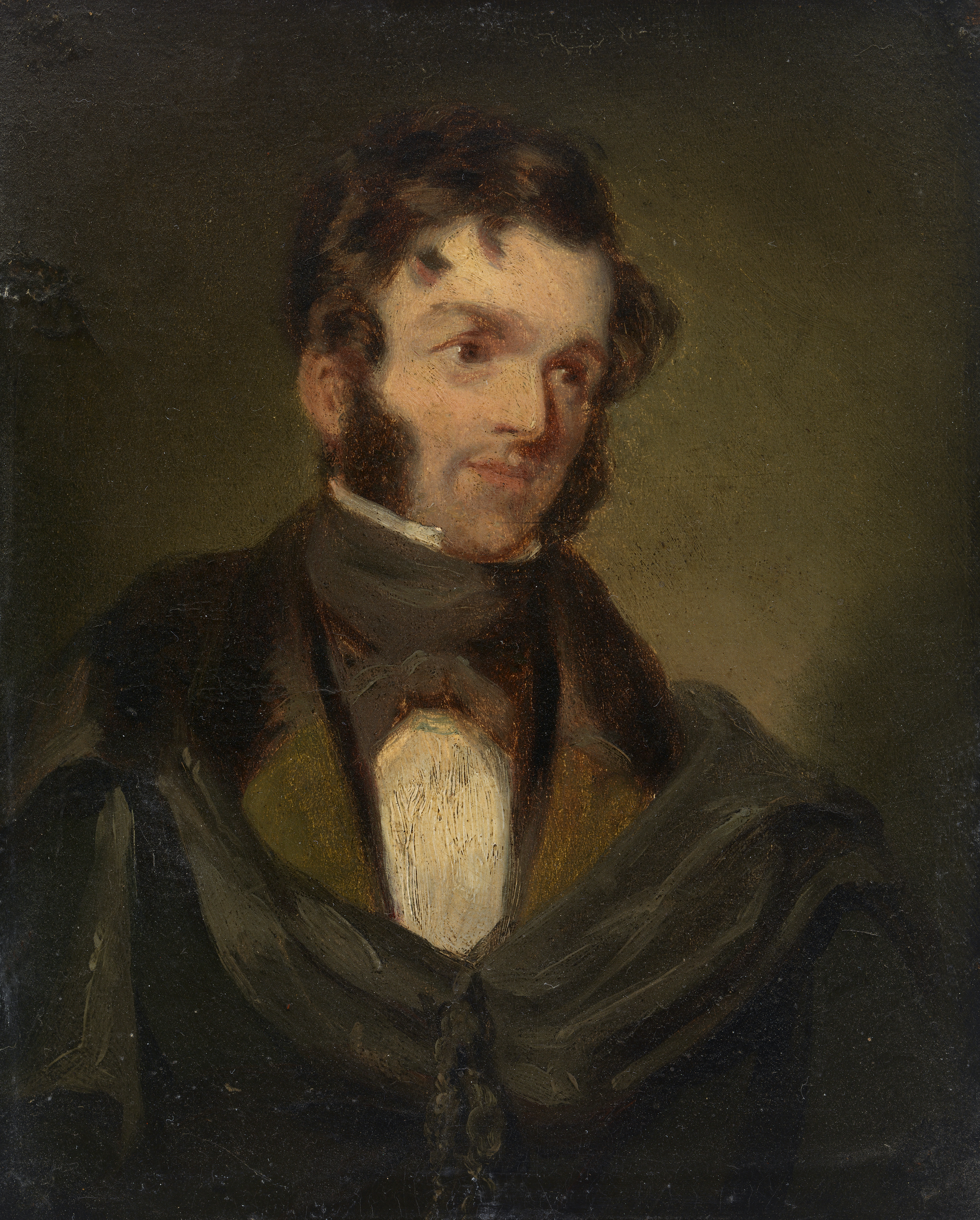
- Portrait by George Francis Mulvany
- Born: 17 October 1803; Dromoland, Newmarket on Fergus, County Clare, Ireland
- Died: 18 June 1864 (aged 60); Bangor, Gwynedd, Wales
- Resting place: Rathronan Cemetery, Ardagh, County Limerick, Ireland; 52.506997°N 9.072535°W
- Education: Trinity College, Cambridge
- Known for: Irish nationalist MP, leader of the Young Ireland movement

William Smith O'Brien (Irish: Liam Mac Gabhann Ó Briain; 17 October 1803 – 18 June 1864) was an Irish republican who, in the course of Ireland's Great Famine, had been converted to the cause of national independence while sitting as a unionist member of the United Kingdom Parliament. Returning from revolutionary Paris (the Second French Republic) with the first Irish tricolour, in 1848 he attempted an armed rebellion. With fellow "Young Irelanders" he was convicted of sedition and transported to Van Diemen's Land (Tasmania). Pardoned, in 1856 he returned to Ireland, where he published an unrepentant memoir and, through Ossianic Society, promoted the study and revival of the Irish language.

== Early life ==
Born in Dromoland, Newmarket on Fergus, County Clare, William Smith O'Brien was the second son of Sir Edward O'Brien, 4th Baronet, of Dromoland Castle. His mother was Charlotte Smith, whose father owned a property called Cahirmoyle in County Limerick. William took the additional surname Smith, his mother's maiden name, upon inheriting the property. He lived at Cahermoyle House, a mile from Ardagh, County Limerick. He was a descendant of the eleventh century Ard Rí (High King of Ireland), Brian Boru. He received an upper-class English education at Harrow School and Trinity College, Cambridge. Subsequently, he studied law at King's Inns in Dublin and Lincoln's Inn in London.

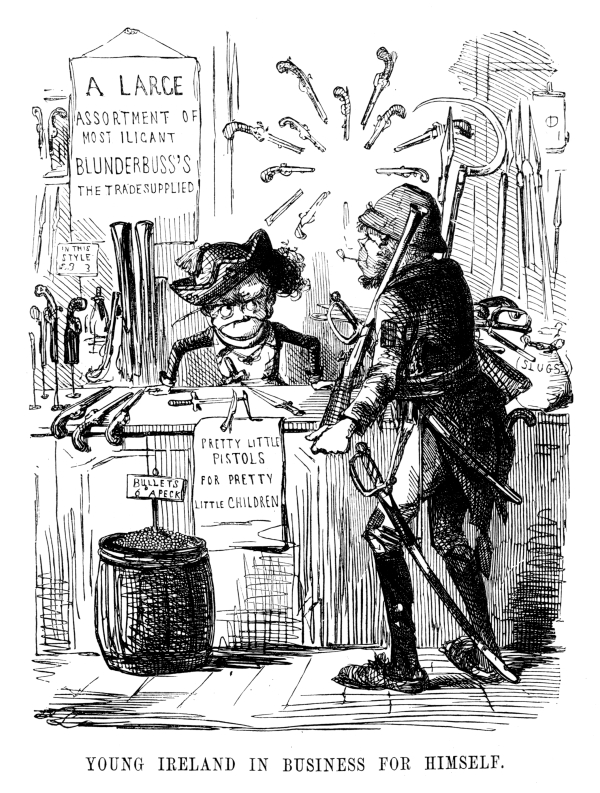
"Young Ireland in Business for Himself", John Leech's satirical 1846 cartoon for Punch magazine showing Smith O'Brien offering "pretty little pistols for pretty little children" after the withdrawal of the Young Irelanders from the Repeal Association

From April 1828 to 1831 Smith O'Brien was the Tory faction MP for Ennis, his father's borough. Although a Protestant country-gentleman, he supported Catholic Emancipation and the Roman Catholic Relief Act 1829 while remaining a supporter of British-Irish union.

In 1835 Smith O'Brien became Whig MP for County Limerick. In 1837 Daniel O'Connell clashed with him over his opposition to the introduction of secret voting in elections and also Smith O'Brien's support for granting state payments to Catholic clergy. The Catholic Bishops came out in support of O'Connell's stance on Church and nation, resolving "most energetically to oppose any such arrangement, and that they look upon those that labour to effect it as the worst enemies of the Catholic religion."

Smith O'Brien remained in the House of Commons until 1849 when his seat was forfeited.

== Young Ireland and the Irish Confederation ==
In 1843, in protest against the imprisonment of Daniel O'Connell, he joined O'Connell's anti-union Repeal Association. Within the association he identified with the circle around Charles Gavan Duffy and his paper The Nation which O'Connell in hostile reference to Giuseppe Mazzini's anti-clerical and insurrectionary Young Italy dubbed Young Ireland.

After O'Connell and his son John forced a division with resolutions renouncing a resort to revolutionary force regardless of circumstances, Smith O'Brien withdrew with the Young Irelanders into a new Irish Confederation, although he was to continue to preach reconciliation until O'Connell's death in May 1847. The objectives of the Confederation were "independence of the Irish nation" with "no means to attain that end abjured, save such as were inconsistent with honour, morality and reason".

In the Confederation, Duffy was trying to hold together a broad national coalition, and had for that reason advanced Smith O'Brien, as a Protestant and a landowner, to the leadership. On the Confederation's Council Duffy and Smith O'Brien were supported by Patrick James Smyth who argued that with propertied classes, as well as the priesthood opposed, the Confederation could not, in the event of insurrection, hope to call out a single parish in Ireland.

As the famine took hold, Smith O'Brien started organising practical relief. By the spring of 1848, the scale of the catastrophe facing the country persuaded all factions on the Irish Confederation Council that independence was an existential issue; that the immediate need was for an Irish national government able take control of national resources. In March 1848, Smith O'Brien called for the formation of a National Guard. He was arrested, but acquitted on a charge of sedition. In May, Duffy published "The Creed of the Nation." If Irish independence was to come by force, it would be in the form of a Republic.

The Government made clear that its chosen response to the crisis in Ireland was coercion not concession. John Mitchel was convicted under new martial law measures approved by Parliament (including by a number of "Old Ireland" O'Connellite MPs). On 9 July 1848 Duffy was arrested for sedition. He managed to smuggle a few lines out to The Nation but the issue that would have carried his declaration, that there was no remedy now but the sword, was seized and the paper suppressed.

== Rebellion ==
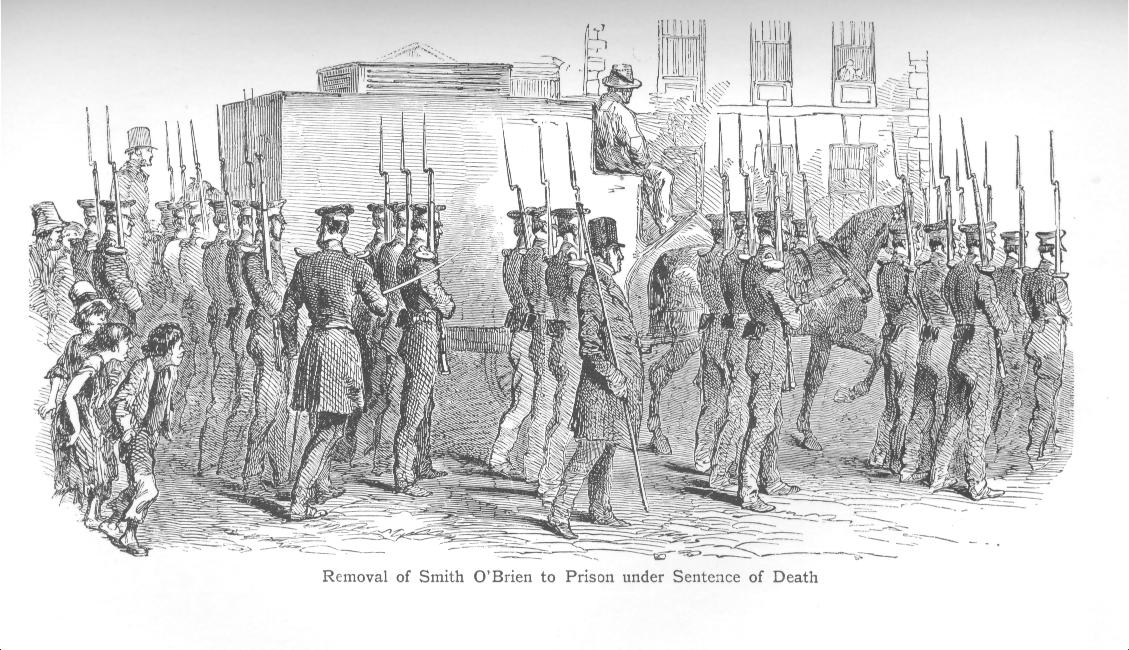
Removal of Smith O'Brien under sentence of death

Planning for an insurrection had already advanced. Mitchel, although the first to call for action, had scoffed at the necessity for systematic preparation. Smith O'Brien, to Duffy's surprise, attempted the task. In March 1848 Smith O'Brien and Thomas Francis Meagher returned from revolutionary Paris with hopes of French assistance. (Among the leading republicans in France, Ledru-Rollin had been loud in his declaration of French support for the Irish cause). There was also talk of an Irish-American brigade and of a Chartist diversion in England With Duffy's arrest, it was left to Smith O'Brien to confront the reality of the Confederates' domestic isolation.

Having with Meagher and John Dillon gathered a small group of both landowners and tenants, on 23 July Smith O'Brien raised the standard of revolt in Kilkenny. This was a tricolour he and Meagher had brought back from France, its colours (green for Catholics, orange for Protestants) intended to symbolise the United Irish republican ideal.

As Smith O'Brien proceeded into County Tipperary he was greeted by curious crowds, but found himself in command of only a few hundred ill-clad largely unarmed men. They scattered after their first skirmish with the constabulary, derisively referred to by The Times of London as "Battle of Widow McCormack's Cabbage Patch".

== Conviction ==
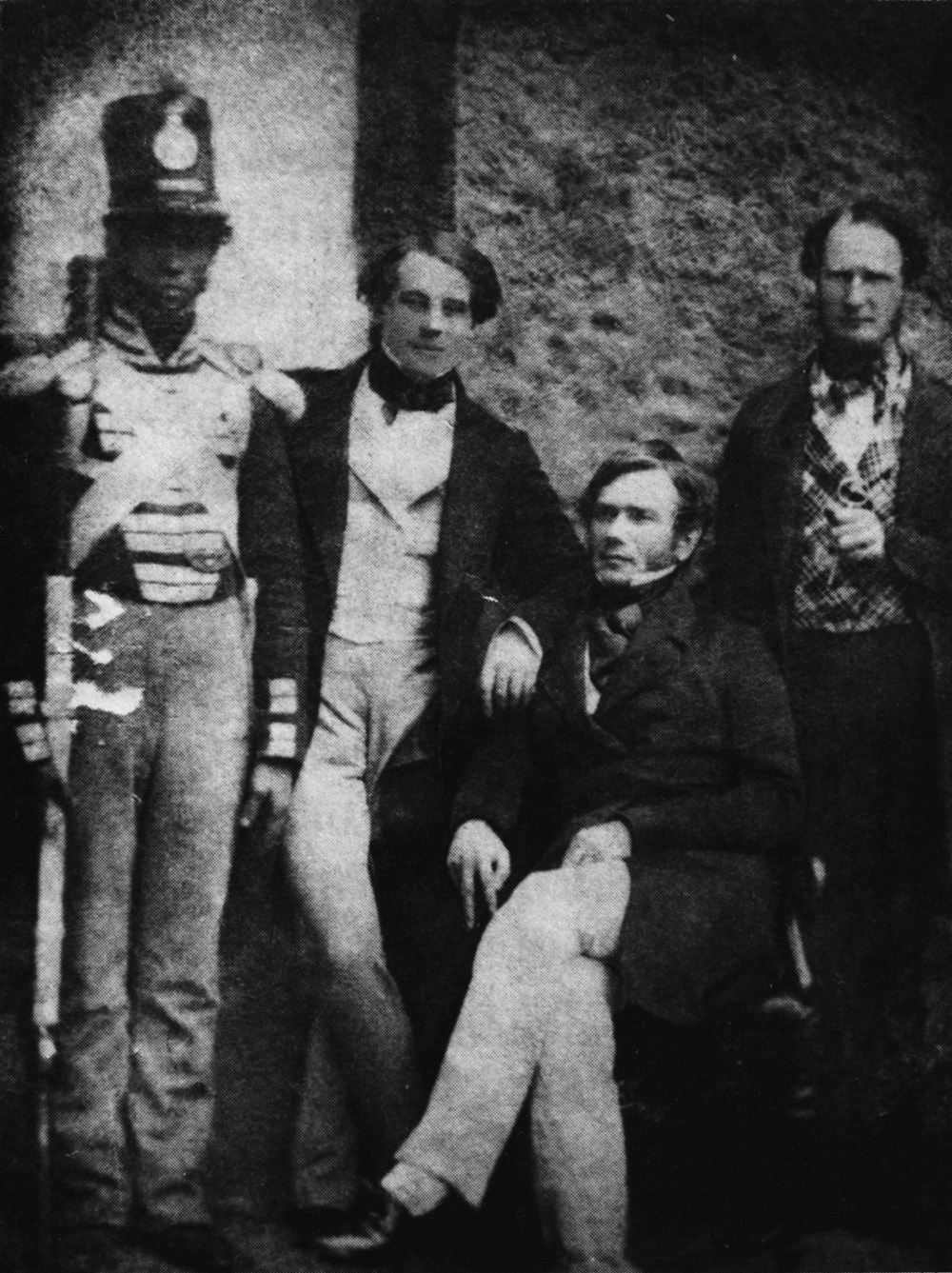
Daguerreotype of Thomas Francis Meagher, William Smith O'Brien with soldier and jailer in Kilmainhaim Gaol, 1848.

On 5 August 1848, O'Brien was recognised by a railway guard at Thurles station, who reported him to the authorities for a reward of £500. A general arrived and ordered the station clerk at gunpoint to arrange a special train to Dublin for the detained man. In the subsequent trial, the jury found him guilty of high treason. He was sentenced to be hanged, drawn, and quartered. Petitions for clemency were signed by 70,000 people in Ireland and 10,000 people in England.

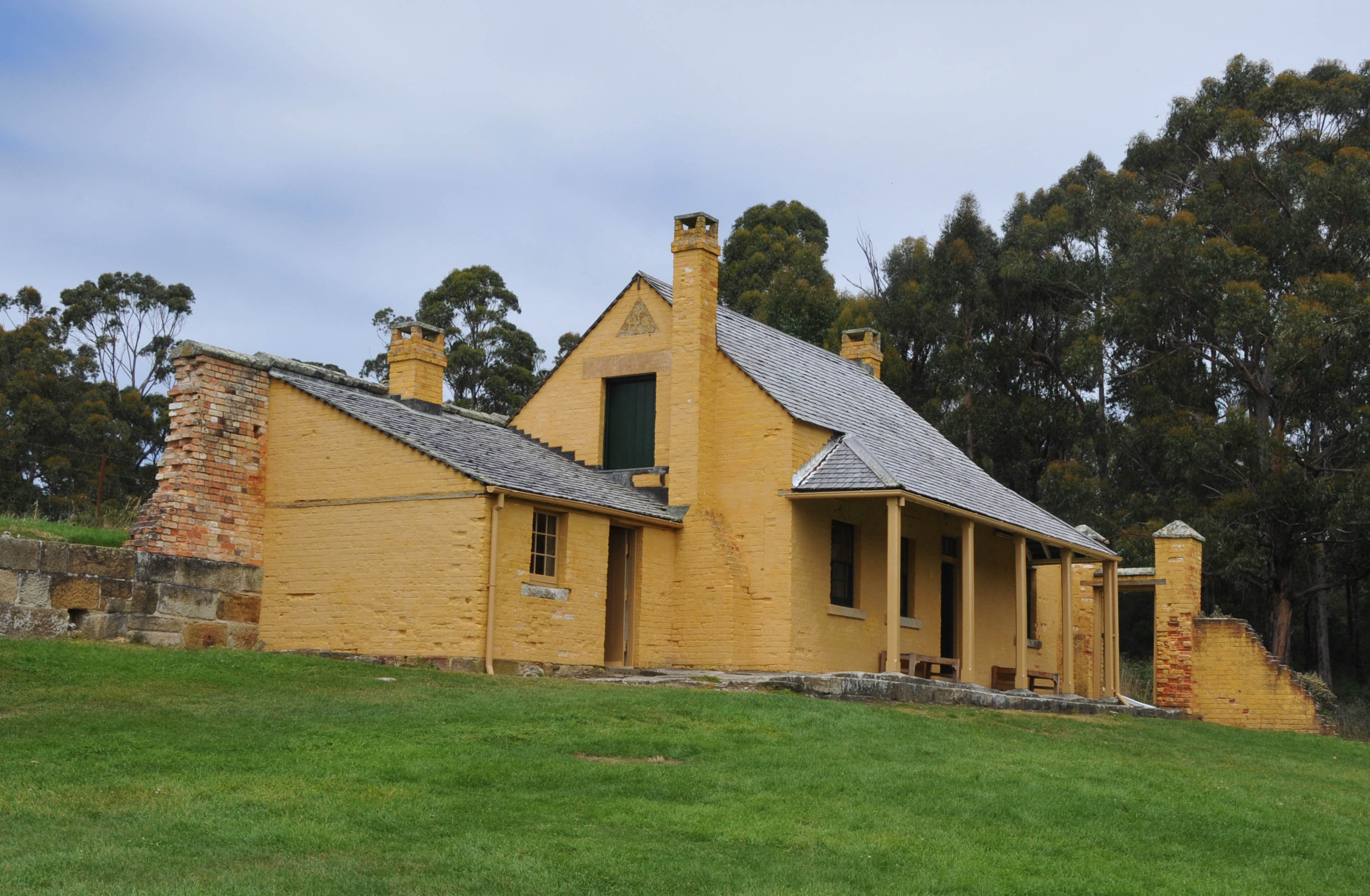
O'Brien's Cottage in Port Arthur, Tasmania.

In Dublin on 5 June 1849, the sentences of O'Brien and his confederates Meagher, Terence MacManus and Patrick O'Donoghue were commuted to transportation for life to Van Diemen's Land (Tasmania in present-day Australia).

O'Brien attempted to escape from Maria Island off Tasmania, but was betrayed by Ellis, the captain of the schooner hired for the escape. He was sent to Port Arthur where he met up with John Mitchel, who had been transported before the rebellion. The cottages which Smith O'Brien lived in on Maria Island and Port Arthur have been preserved in their 19th century state as memorials.

Having emigrated to the United States, Ellis was tried by another Young Irelanders leader, Terence MacManus, at a lynch court in San Francisco for the betrayal of O'Brien. He was freed for lack of evidence.

== Last years ==
=== Return to Ireland ===
In 1854, after five years in Tasmania, O'Brien was released on the condition he never return to the United Kingdom of Great Britain and Ireland. He settled in Brussels. In May 1856, he was granted an unconditional pardon and returned to Ireland that July. He contributed to the Nation newspaper, and published the two-volume Principles of Government, or Meditations in Exile in 1856. But despite the efforts of George Henry Moore to recruit him as a leader of the Independent Irish Party, Smith O'Brien played no further part in politics.

=== Irish language ===
From Brussels, Smith O'Brien had been a founding member of the Ossianic Society. The aim of the scholarly association was to publish and translate literature relating to the Fenian Cycle of Irish mythology and further the revival of the Irish language. From exile, he had written to his son Edward urging him to learn the Irish language. He himself studied the language using an Irish-language Bible, and presented to the Royal Irish Academy Irish-language manuscripts he had collected. He enjoyed the respect of County Clare bards (the county being largely Irish-speaking at the time), and in 1863, on his advice, Irish was introduced into a number of schools there.

=== Death ===
In 1864 he visited England and Wales, with the view of rallying his failing health, but no improvement took place, and he died at Bangor, in Wales on 16 June 1864.

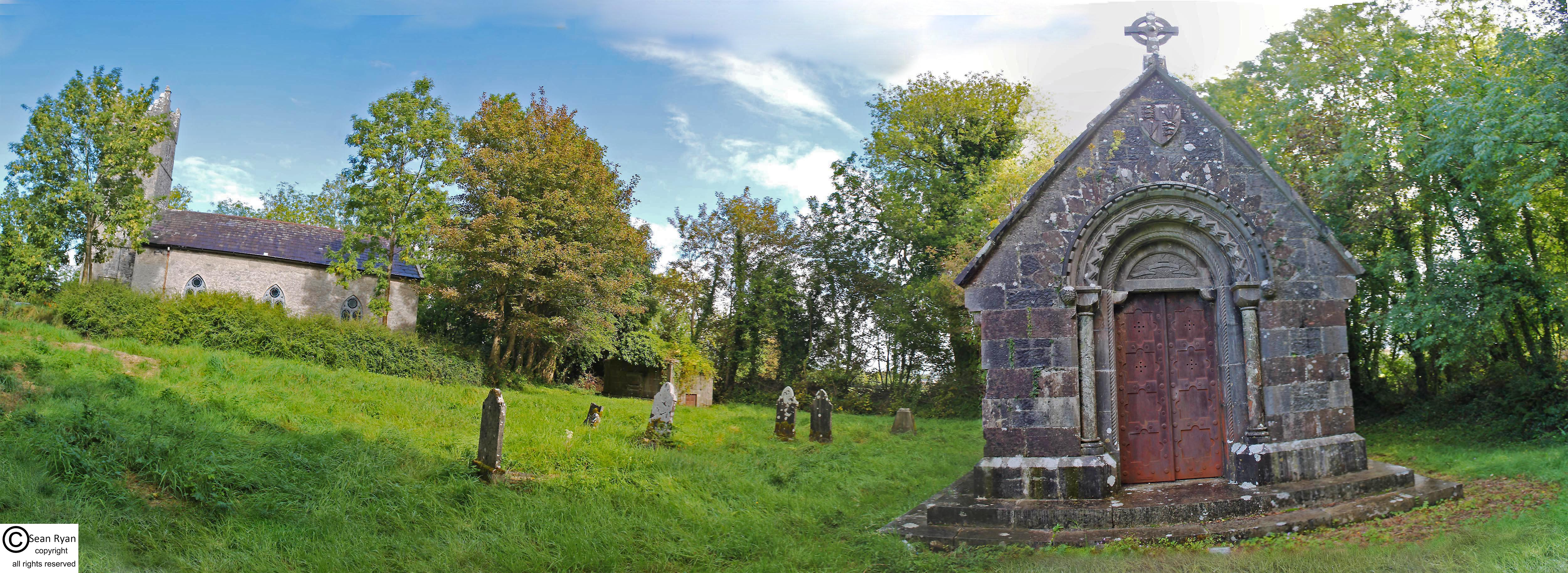
Burial site in County Limerick

== Family ==
While studying in London Smith O'Brien met Mary Ann Wilton and fathered two children born to her. In Autumn 1832 he married Lucy Caroline Gabbett (1811–1861) of County Limerick. They had five boys and two girls.

The children of William Smith O'Brien and Lucy O'Brien were Edward William (Ned) (1831–1909), William Joseph (1839–1867), Lucy Josephine (1840–1907), Lucius Henry (1842–1913), Robert Donough (1844–1917), Charlotte Grace (1845–1909) and Charles Murrough (1849–1877). The elder daughter Lucy Josephine O'Brien married Rev John Gwynn and their children included writer and MP Stephen Gwynn, Lucy Gwynn who was the first woman registrar of Trinity College Dublin, and Edward Gwynn who was Provost of Trinity College Dublin. O'Brien's younger daughter Charlotte Grace O'Brien was a campaigner for the better treatment of Irish emigrants.

William Smith O'Brien's elder brother Lucius O'Brien (1800–1872) was for some time member of parliament for County Clare.

William Smith O'Brien's sister Harriet O'Brien married an Anglican priest but was soon widowed. As Harriet Monsell, she founded the order of Anglican nuns, the Community of St John Baptist, in Clewer, Windsor, in 1851. The gold cross she wore, and which still belongs to the Community, was made with gold panned by her brother during his exile in Australia.

== Commemoration ==
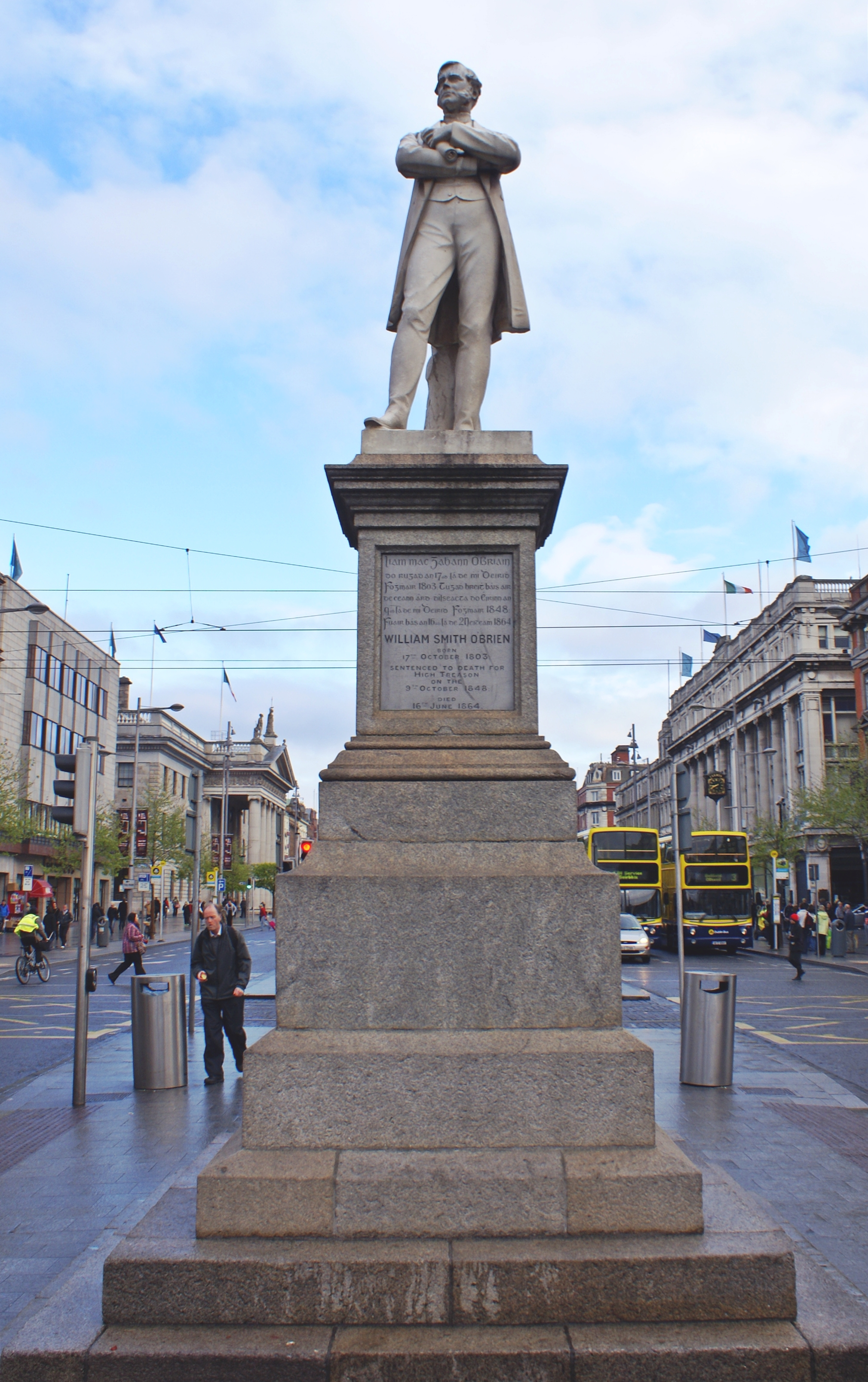
Originally erected on the south quays, this 1870s statue was moved to Dublin's O'Connell Street in 1929

A statue of William Smith O'Brien stands in O'Connell Street, Dublin. Sculpted in Portland limestone, it was designed by Thomas Farrell and erected in D'Olier Street, Dublin, in 1870. It was moved to its present position in 1929.

Smith O'Brien Avenue in Limerick city is named for him. As is Smith O'Brien's GAA club, in Killaloe, County Clare.

In the United States, O'Brien County, Iowa is named after him. In 1920, Puddling Lane in Thurles, County Tipperary was renamed to Smith O'Brien Street.

== See also ==
- List of convicts transported to Australia

Parliament of the United Kingdom
| Preceded by Thomas Frankland Lewis | Member of Parliament for Ennis; 1828–1831 | Succeeded by William Vesey-FitzGerald |
| Preceded by Standish Darby O'Grady | Member of Parliament for County Limerick; 1835–1849 | Succeeded by Samuel Dickson |
