= John Armstrong (Irish politician) =

Irish politician

John Armstrong was an Irish politician.

Armstrong was born in County Tipperary and educated at Trinity College, Dublin. He was MP for Fore in County Westmeath from 1769 to 1776; and for Kilmallock in County Limerick from 1783 to 1792.
