= Charles Silver Oliver =

Irish landowner

Charles Silver Oliver (c. 1765–1770 – 10 October 1817) was an Irish landowner, the son of Silver Oliver, Member of Parliament for Kilmallock.

Charles Silver Oliver was married on 3 June 1805 to Maria Elizabeth, daughter of Abraham Morris. He was Sheriff of County Limerick in 1791, Sovereign (Irish office of Chief of a municipal government) of Kilmallock from 1796 to 1800, and Member of Parliament for Kilmallock from 1798 until he was appointed Escheator of Munster on 15 May 1799.

Through Lord Clare's influence, Oliver represented County Limerick in the United Kingdom House of Commons from 1802 to 1806, though he was not a frequent attender.

In the Wallace family account of the death of Irish patriot Staker Wallace in 1798 in Kilfinnane, Charles Silver Oliver is portrayed as the villain of the piece. Subsequent research by Mannix Joyce indicates disagreements within the Protestant Ascendancy as to the severity of Olivers treatment of Wallace. Wallace was publicly flogged and later executed in Kilfinnane charged with the crime of raising a subscription for the assassination of Charles Silver Oliver.
