= 135th Regiment =

135th Regiment may refer to:

- 135th Aviation Regiment
- 135th Infantry Regiment (United States)
- 135th Regiment of Foot
- 135th (East Anglian) (Hertfordshire Yeomanry) Field Regiment, Royal Artillery

== American Civil War regiments ==
- 135th Illinois Infantry Regiment
- 135th Indiana Infantry Regiment
- 135th New York Infantry Regiment, later the 6th New York Heavy Artillery Regiment
- 135th Ohio Infantry Regiment
- 135th United States Colored Infantry Regiment

== See also ==
- 135th (disambiguation)
