= Vere Hunt =

Irish politician, landowner and businessman

Sir Vere Hunt Bt

Governor of Lundy
- de facto (Note: by virtue of having established an Irish colony on the island)
- In office 1802–?
- Preceded by: Colony established Thomas Benson (as lessee of Lundy)
- Succeeded by: Colony dissolved William Hudson Heaven (as its private owner)

Mayor of New Birmingham, County Tipperary de facto (Note: due to being the town's founder)
- In office Unknown
- Preceded by: Village established

Member of the Irish House of Commons for Askeaton
- In office 1798–1800

Personal details
- Born: 1761
- Died: 11 August 1818 (aged 56–57)
- Spouse: Eleanor Pery
- Children: Sir Aubrey de Vere, 2nd Baronet
- Parent(s): Vere Hunt; Anne Browne

Military service
- Allegiance: Kingdom of Great Britain
- Branch/service: British Army
- Years of service: 1796
- Rank: Commander
- Commands: 135th (Limerick) Regiment of Foot
- Battles/wars: French Revolutionary Wars

Sir Vere Hunt, 1st Baronet of Currah (1761 – 11 August 1818) was an Irish politician, landowner and businessman. He is chiefly remembered for founding the village of New Birmingham in County Tipperary, for his ill-advised purchase of the island of Lundy, and for his entertaining diary. He was a colourful character, who was noted for his heavy drinking and gambling, but also for his intellectual interests, and his stern criticism of his own class.

== Family ==
He was the son of Vere Hunt of Curragh, County Limerick and Glengoole, County Tipperary, by his second wife, Anne Browne, daughter of Edmund Browne of New Grove, County Clare and his wife Jane Westropp, and sister of Montfort Browne, who was Lieutenant Governor of West Florida and then Governor of the Bahamas. His father was the eldest son of the Reverend Vere Hunt (died 1759), and his wife Constantia Piers, granddaughter of Sir Henry Piers, 1st Baronet. He was a descendant of the Earls of Oxford through Jane de Vere, a granddaughter of the 15th Earl, who married Henry Hunt in 1572. His own son changed the family name to de Vere. Sir Vere's great-great-grandfather, yet another Vere Hunt, was an army officer who served with Oliver Cromwell and who settled in Ireland in 1657.

The Hunt/de Vere family estate, which they owned for 300 years (1657–1957), including the period of the de Vere Baronetcy of Curragh, is the present day Curraghchase Forest Park, in County Limerick.

Hunt was created a baronet, in the Baronetage of Ireland, on 4 or 13 December 1784 and was appointed High Sheriff of County Limerick the same year. Hunt raised and commanded three regiments of foot during the French Revolutionary Wars, including the 135th (Limerick) Regiment of Foot. He was a member of the Irish House of Commons for Askeaton from 1798 to 1800.

He married Eleanor Pery, daughter of William Pery, 1st Baron Glentworth and his first wife Jane Walcott, on 4 March 1783; they had one son, Sir Aubrey de Vere, 2nd Baronet. The marriage is said to have been unhappy, although he always referred to his wife with respect; they mostly lived apart. She died in 1821. He was the grandfather of the poet and critic Aubrey Thomas de Vere and the politician and social commentator Sir Stephen de Vere, 4th Baronet.

== Career ==
Against his political inclinations, he voted for the Act of Union 1800, apparently in the hope of recouping the heavy expenses (estimated at £5000) which he had incurred as an MP (the Crown was shameless about bribing politicians to vote in favour of the Union). He was never a good man of business, as shown by his unwise purchase in 1802 of the island of Lundy, which attracted him because the owner was not liable to pay taxes. Here he settled an Irish colony, with its own constitution, laws, and coinage. However, the colonists were unable to make a profit, due to agricultural problems, and the venture cost him so much money that he spent years pleading with the British Crown to take it off his hands; it was only many years after his death that his son was able to dispose of it.

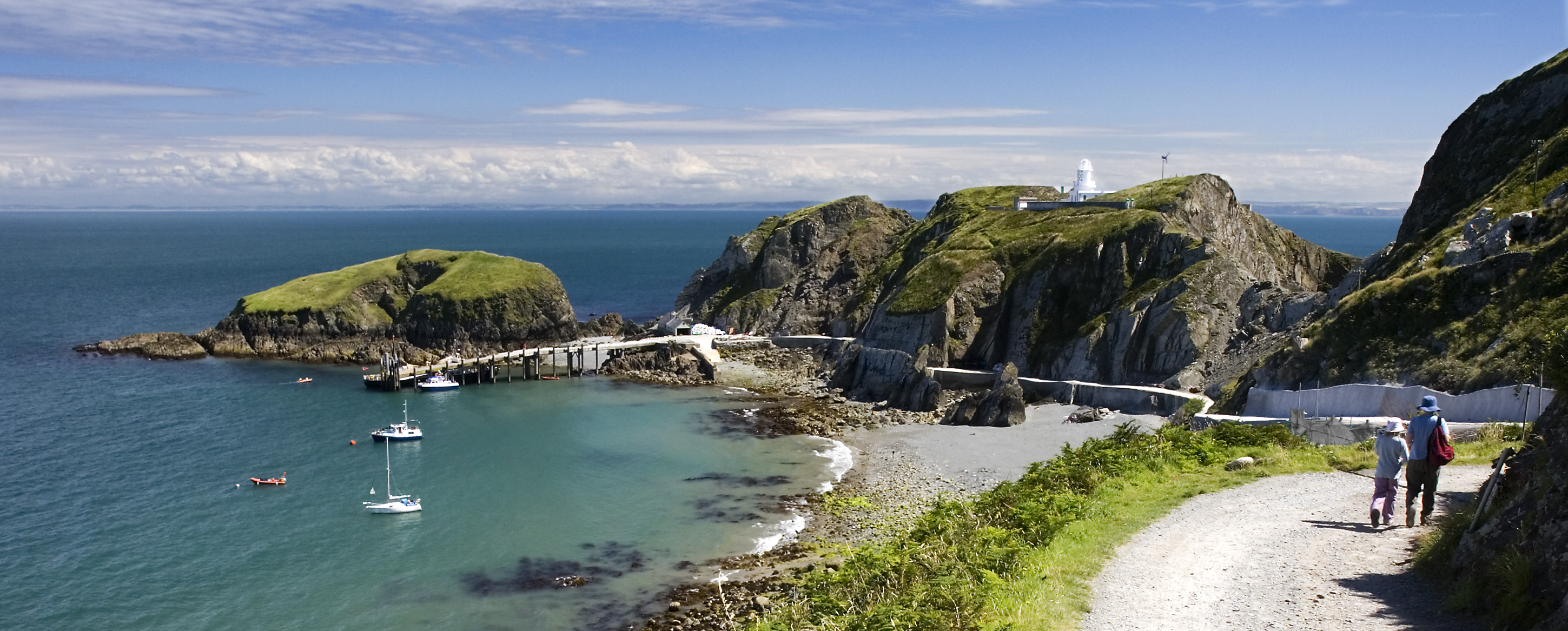
Lundy, which Sir Vere purchased in 1802, an act he quickly regretted.

He was also a very heavy gambler, and his debts became so large that he was imprisoned for debt for much of 1803 in the Fleet Prison, despite his claims that the Crown owed him large sums of money. On the other hand he was a good landlord, who was always anxious to improve the condition of his tenants. He opened a coal mine at Glengoole, County Tipperary, and for the benefit of the miners he founded the village of New Birmingham, near Thurles, with the help of the local priest Friar Meighan (who was a personal friend, despite Hunt's suspicion of Catholic priests). He obtained a charter to hold regular markets and fairs in the village. He evidently hoped to turn New Birmingham into a major manufacturing centre, but failed in this aim, as in many of his other business ventures, although the village itself survived.

== Personality ==
His entertaining diary, of which several extracts have been published, shows him as an eccentric character with a great ability to enjoy life. It deals especially with the pleasures of good food and drink, music and theatre. The diary gives a valuable glimpse of social life in the Dublin of the early nineteenth century, and describes the fashionable taverns, eating houses and theatres. He managed a touring theatrical company, and founded at least one newspaper. He had some of the normal tastes and prejudices of his class; for example, he was addicted to duelling, fighting his first duel at the age of eighteen. He was in general hostile to Catholic priests, although he was a strong supporter of Catholic Emancipation, and numbered some priests among his friends, notably the aforementioned Friar.

In other respects he has been described as a "maverick", who was hostile to his own class, the Anglo-Irish elite, which was centred on Dublin Castle, "this fallen and degraded sham-court", as Hunt described it. On 4 June 1813 he was at an official reception at Dublin Castle, which he described in scathing terms as being attended by "pimps, parasites, hangers-on... spies, informers... alas poor Ireland".

== Male Haplogroup ==
Based on 6 Big Y DNA tests of the descendants from different lines from Captain Vere Hunt, he would be under J-FTC12268.

Parliament of Ireland
Preceded by Sir Joseph Hoare, Bt; John Stewart	Member of Parliament for Askeaton; 1798–1800; With: Sir Joseph Hoare, Bt	Parliament of the United Kingdom
Baronetage of Ireland
New creation	Baronet (of Curragh); 1784–1818	Succeeded by Aubrey de Vere
