= De Vere baronets =

Extinct baronetcy in the Baronetage of Ireland

Escutcheon of the de Vere baronets of Curragh

The Hunt, later de Vere Baronetcy, of Curragh in the County of Limerick, was a title in the Baronetage of Ireland. It was created on 4 December 1784 for Vere Hunt, who subsequently represented Askeaton in the Irish House of Commons.

The 2nd Baronet assumed the surname of de Vere in lieu of his patronymic in 1832. He was a writer whose third son, Aubrey Thomas de Vere, was a renowned poet and critic. He added to the front of the family seat at Curragh Chase, Adare, and designed the landscape of the garden.

The 4th Baronet represented County Limerick in Parliament from 1854 to 1859. The title became extinct on his death in 1904. In 1883 the family estate in co. Limerick was 4,167 acres (1,686 ha).

== Hunt, later de Vere baronets, of Curragh (1784) ==
- Sir Vere Hunt, 1st Baronet (1761–1818)
- Sir Aubrey (Hunt) de Vere, 2nd Baronet (1788–1846)
- Sir Vere Edmond de Vere, 3rd Baronet (1808–1880)
- Sir Stephen Edward de Vere, 4th Baronet (1812–1904)

Baronetage of Great Britain
Preceded by Blaquiere baronets	Hunt baronets of Curragh; 10 December 1775	Succeeded by Hoare baronets
