= 135th =

135th may refer to:

== Military units ==
- 135th (2/1st South Western) Brigade, a formation of the Territorial Force of the British Army
- 135th (Limerick) Regiment of Foot, an infantry regiment of the British Army, created and promptly disbanded in 1796
- 135th (Middlesex) Battalion, CEF, a unit in the Canadian Expeditionary Force during the First World War
- 135th Aero Squadron or 22d Tactical Drone Squadron, an inactive United States Air Force unit
- 135th Airlift Group, an airlift unit located at Warfield Air National Guard Base in Middle River, Maryland
- 135th Intelligence Squadron, one of two flying units of the Maryland Air National Guard
- 135th Illinois Infantry Regiment, a volunteer regiment in the Union Army during the American Civil War
- 135th Infantry Regiment (United States), an infantry regiment in the Army National Guard
- 135th Ohio Infantry Regiment (or 135th OVI), an infantry regiment in the Union Army during the American Civil War
- 135th Quartermaster Company or 87th Combat Sustainment Support Battalion (United States)
- 135th Expeditionary Sustainment Command, a subordinate unit of the 167th Theater Sustainment Command and the Alabama Army National Guard
- 2d Battalion, 135th Aviation Regiment (United States), an Army helicopter battalion which deployed to Iraq
- 135th (East Anglian) (Hertfordshire Yeomanry) Field Regiment, Royal Artillery, a British Territorial Army unit 1939–1942

== Other uses ==
- 135th Delaware General Assembly, a meeting of the legislative branch of the Delaware states government
- 135th Georgia General Assembly succeeded the 134th and served as the precedent for the 136th General Assembly in 1981
- 135th Kentucky Derby, the 2009 Kentucky Derby
- 135th meridian east, a line of longitude across the Arctic Ocean, Asia, the Pacific Ocean, Australasia, the Indian Ocean, the Southern Ocean and Antarctica
- 135th meridian west, a line of longitude across the Arctic Ocean, North America, the Pacific Ocean, the Southern Ocean and Antarctica
- 135th Street station (IND Eighth Avenue Line), a local station on the IND Eighth Avenue Line of the New York City Subway
- 135th Street station (IRT Lenox Avenue Line), a station on the IRT Lenox Avenue Line of the New York City Subway
- 135th Street station (IRT Ninth Avenue Line), a station on the demolished IRT Ninth Avenue Line
- 135th Street (Manhattan), New York
- Connecticut's 135th House of Representatives district
- Pennsylvania's 135th Representative District or Pennsylvania House of Representatives, District 135

== See also ==
- 135 (number)
- AD 135, the year 135 (CXXXV) of the Julian calendar
- 135 BC
- May 15, 135th day of the year in a standard year
