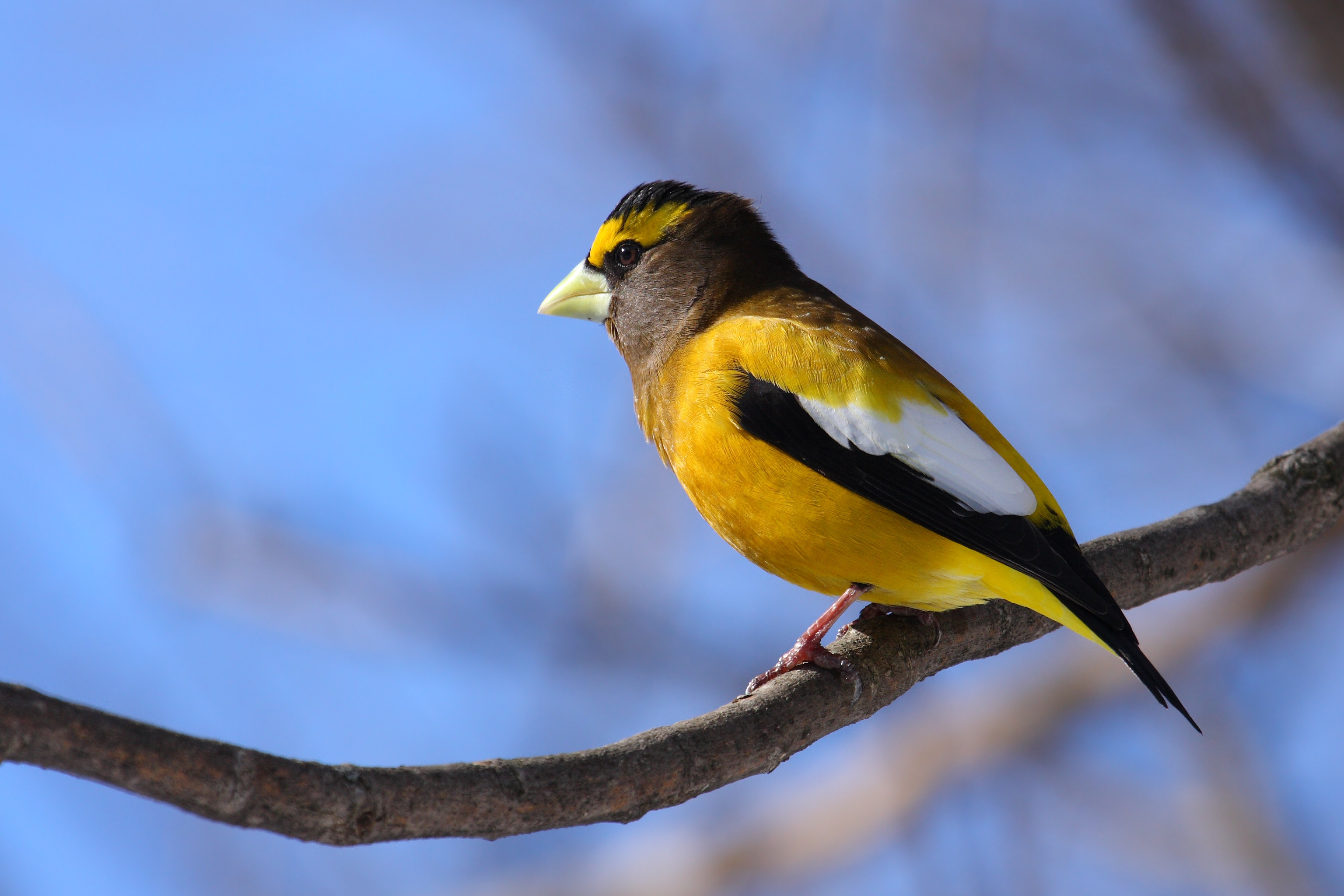
- Male H. v. vespertina Cap Tourmente National Wildlife Area, Quebec
- Male H. v. brooksi Whistler, British Columbia

Conservation status
- Vulnerable (IUCN 3.1)

Scientific classification
- Kingdom: Animalia
- Phylum: Chordata
- Class: Aves
- Order: Passeriformes
- Family: Fringillidae
- Subfamily: Carduelinae
- Genus: Hesperiphona
- Species: H. vespertina

Binomial name
- Hesperiphona vespertina (W. Cooper, 1825)
- Range of H. vespertina Year-round range Wintering range

Synonyms
- Coccothraustes vespertinus

Audio
- Call

= Evening grosbeak =

Evening grosbeak Temporal range: Pleistocene–present

Species of bird

The evening grosbeak (Hesperiphona vespertina) is a passerine bird in the finch family Fringillidae found in North America.

The evening grosbeak is bulky, with a large bill and short tail. The bird has a distinct appearance, with the adult male featuring a bright yellow forehead and body, brown head, and white wing patches, while the adult female has a mainly olive-brown body with greyer underparts and white wing patches.

The evening grosbeak breeds in coniferous and mixed forests across Canada, the western mountainous areas of the United States, and Mexico. Its migration pattern is variable, sometimes reaching as far south as the southern U.S. in winters. These birds forage in trees and bushes, and their diet mainly consists of seeds, berries, and insects. The bird's range has expanded eastward in historical times, likely due to the planting of Manitoba maples and other shrubs near farms and the availability of bird feeders during winter.

== Taxonomy ==
The evening grosbeak was formally described in 1825 by the American naturalist William Cooper and given the binomial name Fringilla vespertina. Cooper had been sent a specimen by the ethnologist Henry Schoolcraft that had been collected in the evening near Sault Ste. Marie, Michigan. Cooper recorded the name of the bird in the Ojibwe language as "Paushkundamo".

The IOC checklist and the Handbook of the Birds of the World place the evening grosbeak and the closely related hooded grosbeak in the genus Hesperiphona. However, the Clements Checklist and the AOS checklist place the evening and hooded grosbeaks in the genus Coccothraustes with the hawfinch.

The genus Hesperiphona was introduced by Charles Lucien Bonaparte in 1850. The name is from Ancient Greek hesperos meaning "evening" and phōnē meaning "sound" or "cry". The specific epithet is from Latin vespertinus meaning "of evening", "of twilight" or "crepuscular".

Three subspecies are recognised:

- Hesperiphona vespertina vespertina (Cooper, W, 1825) – central, east Canada and northeast USA
- Hesperiphona vespertina brooksi Grinnell, 1917 – west Canada and northwest USA
- Hesperiphona vespertina montana Ridgway, 1874 – southwest USA to southwest Mexico

== Description ==
The evening grosbeak is similar in appearance to the Eurasian hawfinch, both being bulky, heavily built finches with large bills and short tails. The evening grosbeak ranges in length from 16 to 22 cm (6.3 to 8.7 in) and spans 30 to 36 cm (12 to 14 in) across the wings. In a large sampling of grosbeaks in Pennsylvania during winter, males weighed from 38.7 to 86.1 g (1.37 to 3.04 oz), with an average of 60 g (2.1 oz), while females weighed from 43.2 to 73.5 g (1.52 to 2.59 oz), with an average of 58.7 g (2.07 oz). Among standard measurements, the wing chord is 10.45 to 11.6 cm (4.11 to 4.57 in), the tail is 6 to 6.95 cm (2.36 to 2.74 in), the bill is 1.6 to 2 cm (0.63 to 0.79 in) and the tarsus is 1.95 to 2.2 cm (0.77 to 0.87 in). The adult has a short black tail, black wings and a large pale bill. The adult male has a bright yellow forehead and body; its head is brown and there is a large white patch in the wing. The adult female is mainly olive-brown, greyer on the underparts and with white patches in the wings. They also have a loud distinctive 'chew' call, similar to a glorified house sparrow.

== Breeding and ecology ==
The breeding habitat is coniferous and mixed forest across Canada and the western mountainous areas of the United States and Mexico. It is an extremely rare vagrant to the British Isles, with just two records so far. The nest is built on a horizontal branch or in a fork of a tree.

The migration of this bird is variable; in some winters, it may wander as far south as the southern U.S.

These birds forage in trees and bushes, sometimes on the ground. They mainly eat seeds, berries, and insects. Outside of the nesting season they often feed in flocks. Sometimes, they will swallow fine gravel.

The range of this bird has expanded far to the east in historical times, possibly due to plantings of Manitoba maples and other maples and shrubs around farms and the availability of bird feeders in winter.

== Gallery ==
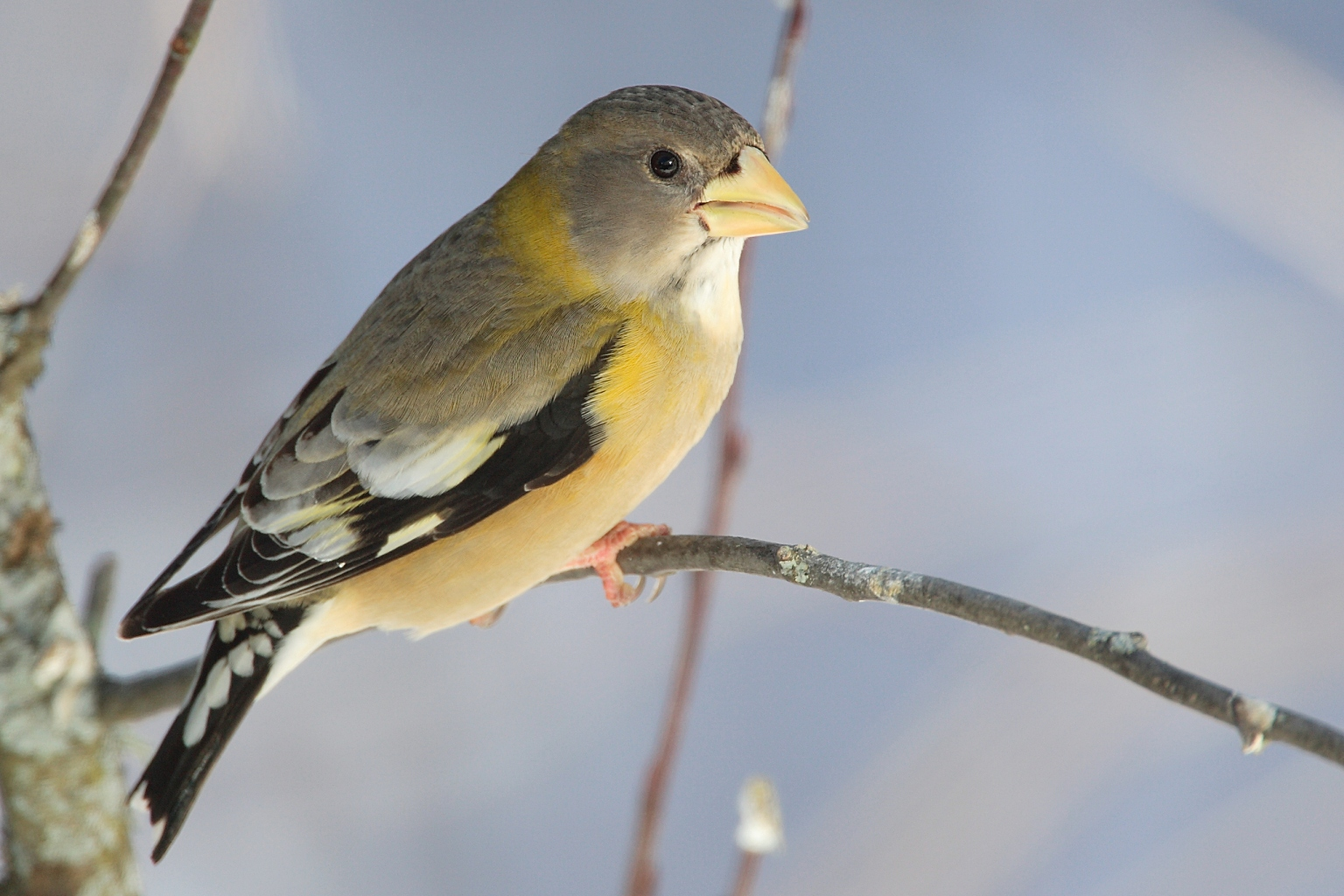
Female evening grosbeak in Algonquin Provincial Park, Ontario, Canada

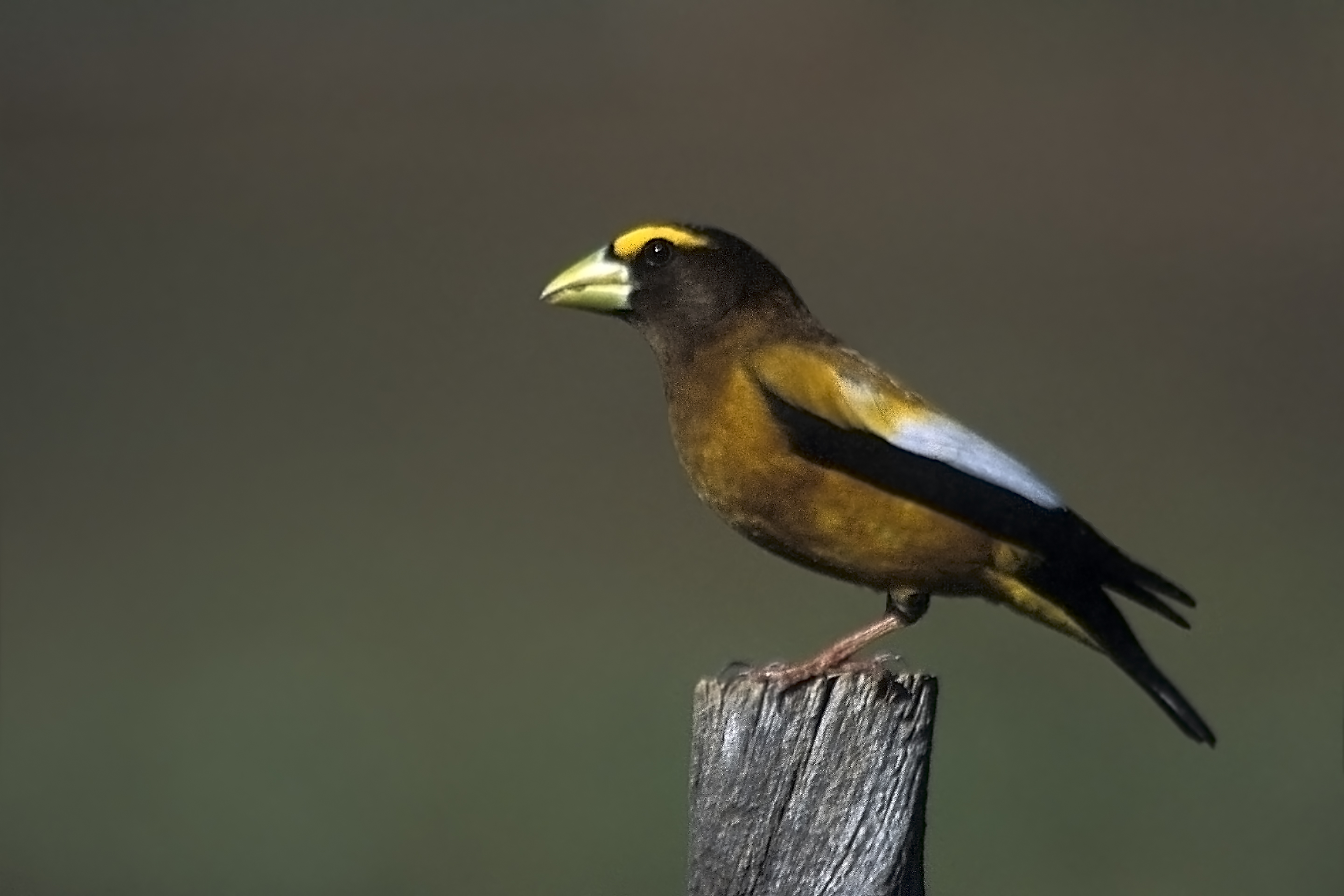
Male evening grosbeak in Truchas, New Mexico

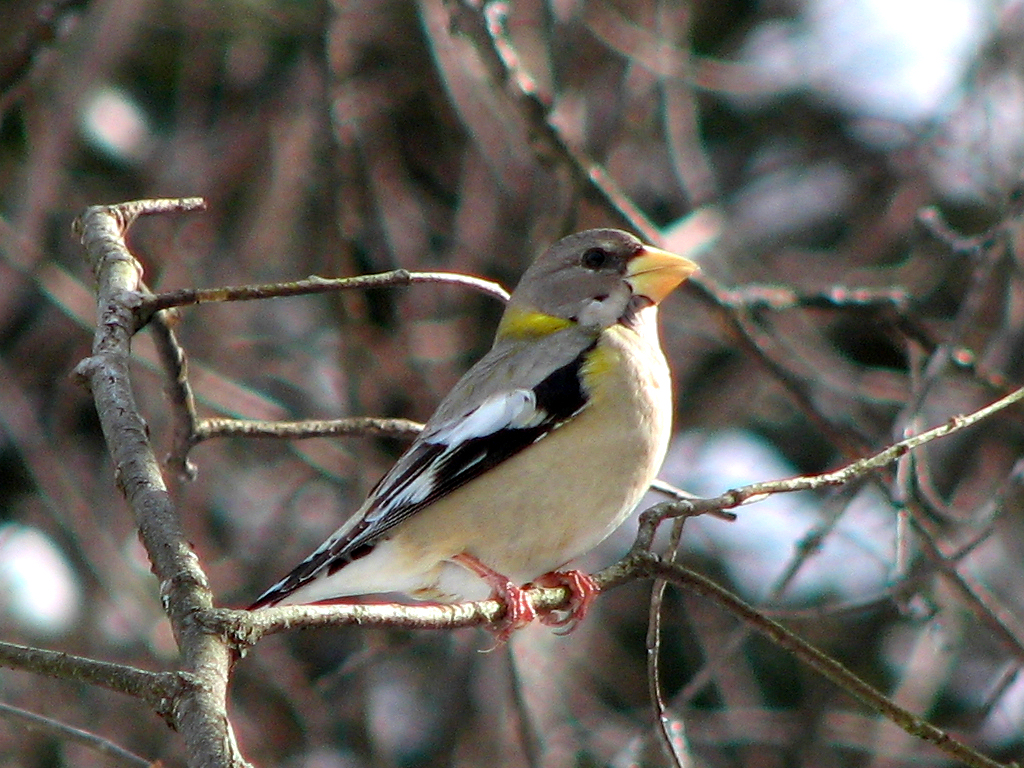
Female in winter, Gatineau Park, Quebec, Canada

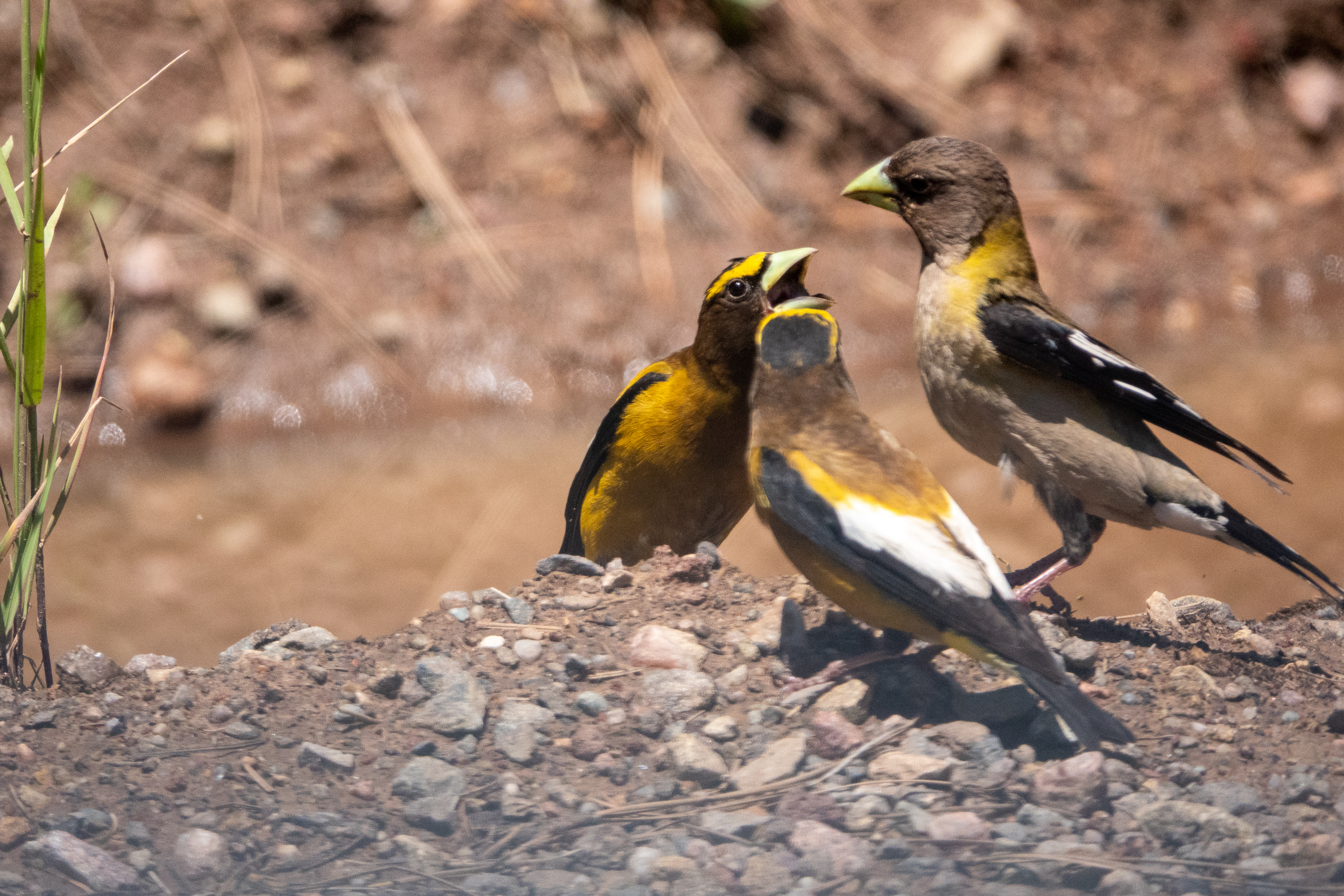
Group in Carson National Forest, New Mexico

Feeding on sunflower seeds
