= 135 =

135 may refer to:

- 135 (number), the natural number following 134 and preceding 136
- AD 135
- 135 BC
- 135 film, better known as 35 mm film, is a format of photographic film used for still photography
- 135 (New Jersey bus), a New Jersey Transit bus route
- 135 Hertha, a main-belt asteroid
- Škoda 135, a small family car

== See also ==
- 135th (disambiguation)
