= Turbonilla gabbiana =

Scientific classification
- Kingdom: Animalia
- Phylum: Mollusca
- Class: Gastropoda
- Family: Pyramidellidae
- Genus: Turbonilla
- Species: T. gabbiana

Binomial name
- Turbonilla gabbiana (J. G. Cooper, 1867)

Synonyms
- Chemnitzia gabbiana J.G. Cooper, 1867

Species of gastropod

Turbonilla gabbiana is a species of sea snail, a marine gastropod mollusk in the family Pyramidellidae, the pyrams and their allies.
