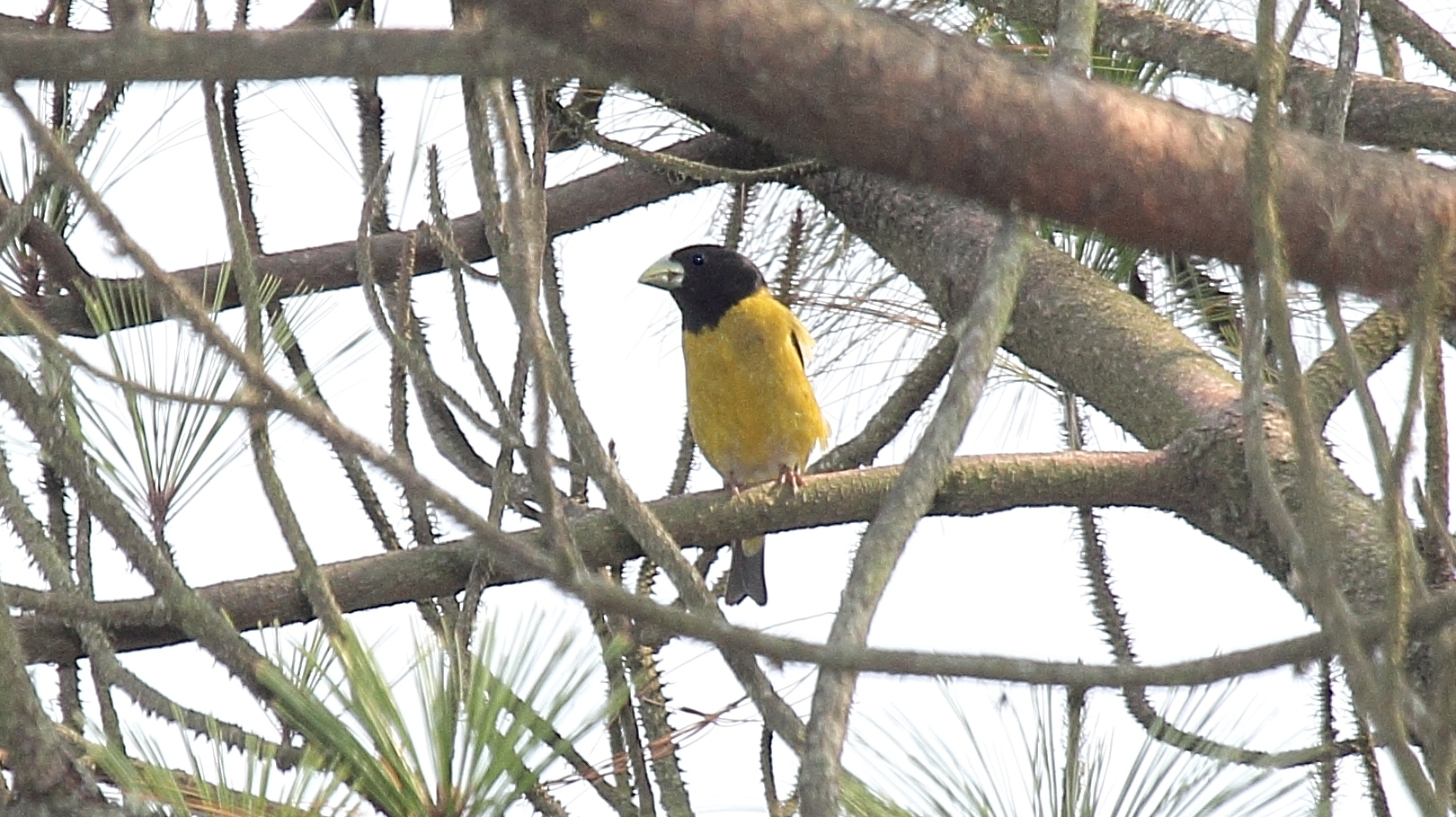

Conservation status
- Least Concern (IUCN 3.1)

Scientific classification
- Kingdom: Animalia
- Phylum: Chordata
- Class: Aves
- Order: Passeriformes
- Family: Fringillidae
- Subfamily: Carduelinae
- Genus: Hesperiphona
- Species: H. abeillei

Binomial name
- Hesperiphona abeillei (Lesson, RP, 1839)

Synonyms
- See text

= Hooded grosbeak =

Species of bird

The hooded grosbeak or Albiellé's grosbeak (Hesperiphona abeillei) is a passerine bird in the family Fringillidae, the finches and euphonias. It is found in Guatemala, El Salvador, and Mexico.

== Taxonomy and systematics ==
The species was originally described by the French naturalist René Lesson in 1839 with the binomial Guiraca abaillei. It was later reassigned to genus Hesperiphona that Charles Lucien Bonaparte had erected in 1850. Still later it was assigned to genus Coccothraustes that Brisson had erected in 1760. By 2025 most taxonomic systems had restored it to genus Hesperiphona However, the American Ornithological Society (AOS) declined to make that change and retains the species in Cocothraustes.

The hooded grosbeak shares its genus with the evening grosbeak (H. vespertina). It has these four subspecies:

- H. a. pallida Nelson, 1928
- H. a. saturata Sutton & Burleigh, 1939
- H. a. abeillei (Lesson, RP, 1839)
- H. a. cobanensis Nelson, 1928

== Description ==
The hooded grosbeak is a large, stocky bird with a very thick bill. It is 15 to 18.5 cm (5.9 to 7.3 in) long and weighs about 50 g (1.8 oz). The species is sexually dimorphic. Adult males of the nominate subspecies H. a. abeillei have a entirely black head and throat. Their mantle, back, and scapulars are yellow-olive to light olive-green and their lower back and rump a brighter yellow. Their uppertail coverts are black or yellow with some feathers tipped with black. Their tail is black and has a shallow fork. Their wing coverts and flight feathers are mostly black with silvery gray on some coverts and the tertials. Their underparts are bright yellow. Females have a black crown and nape, black lores, and a yellowish-washed grayish green to olive green face. Their mantle, back, and scapulars are olive to olive-green with a yellow wash and their rump a paler yellow. Their wings are similar to the males' with a white spot at the base of the inner primaries. Their tail is mostly black with white tips on the outer three pairs of feathers. Both sexes have a brown iris and pale brownish, pinkish, or pinkish brown legs and feet. Males have a pale greenish yellow or greenish lemon bill; females' bills are slightly duller.

Subspecies H. a. pallida is overall paler and grayer than the nominate. Males have dull gray-brown upperparts and whitish to pale yellow undertail coverts. Females have an entirely black tail and no greenish tinge on their underparts. H. a. saturata is the dullest and grayest subspecies. Males have less yellow than the nominate on both their upper- and underparts and white tips on the inner webs of the outermost pair of tail feathers. Females have greener upperparts than the nominate. H. a. cobanensis males have brighter yellow upperparts and a much brighter yellow breast than the nominate. Their tertials are white. Their undertail coverts are paler. Females are more buffish brown with a yellow wash on the sides of the neck and on the breast.

== Distribution and habitat ==
The hooded grosbeak has a highly disjunct distribution. The subspecies are found thus:

- H. a. pallida: southern Chihuahua,. Sinaloa, and Durango states in northwestern Mexico
- H. a. saturata: eastern San Luis Potosí and southwestern Tamaulipas states in northeastern Mexico
- H. a. abeillei from Guerrero and Michoacán east to Veracruz and northern Oaxaca in central to southern Mexico
- H. a. cobanensis: from southeastern Chiapas in southern Mexico south into southwestern Guatemala (but see below)

Most sources agree with the above range of H. a. cobanensis. However, the AOS and at least one field guide include far northern El Salvador in its range. Its El Salvador range possibly extends into adjacent Honduras.

The hooded grosbeak inhabits montane evergreen, pine, pine-oak, and semi-deciduous forest in the subtropical and temperate zones. Sources differ on its elevational range. One states it is 900 to 3,200 m (3,000 to 10,500 ft) and another 1,000 to 3,500 m (3,300 to 11,500 ft). In Guatemala and El Salvador it ranges from 1,200 to 2,300 m (3,900 to 7,500 ft).

== Behavior ==
=== Movement ===
The hooded grosbeak is almost entirely a year-round resident. However, some apparently move to lower elevations in the non-breeding season.

=== Feeding ===
The hooded grosbeak's diet is not known in detail but includes seeds, berries, fruits, and buds. It typically is found in pairs or small flocks but flocks of up to 50 have been observed in the non-breeding season. It forages mostly in the forest's mid- to upper levels but also on the ground.

=== Breeding ===
The hooded grosbeak breeds between May and July. Its one known nest was a cup made mostly of small twigs that the female alone constructed. It was about 7 m (25 ft) above the ground in a tall cypress and well hidden in foliage. The clutch size, incubation period, time to fledging, and details of parental care are not known.

=== Vocalization ===
The hooded grosbeak's song is "clipped, slightly metallic, burry rolling phrases often preceded by calls, described as beenk beenk eihrr-r, wheirr whrr, beehn beehn bee-beihr, be-be jerr chee, be-be chee; a buzzing wij-ee-er-tee; or bee-bink-beeaw. At least in Guatemala the sexes have different calls. The male's are "a loud, ringing peet!-peet! and peet!-peet!-peeeeeurrr" and the female's "a ringing pit!-preee! and peeeur'teee!.

== Status ==
The IUCN has assessed the hooded grosbeak as being of Least Concern. It has a very large range; its estimated population of 20,000 to 50,000 mature individuals is believed to be decreasing. No immediate threats have been identified. "The Hooded Grosbeak faces heightened risk because of its specialization on threatened tropical highland forest habitats. The primary threat to this species is loss of this habitat type due to unsustainable logging, wood harvesting, and livestock grazing. It also faces future threats from climate change."
