= New Birmingham =

Village in County Tipperary, Ireland

New Birmingham Gleann an Ghuail
- Village
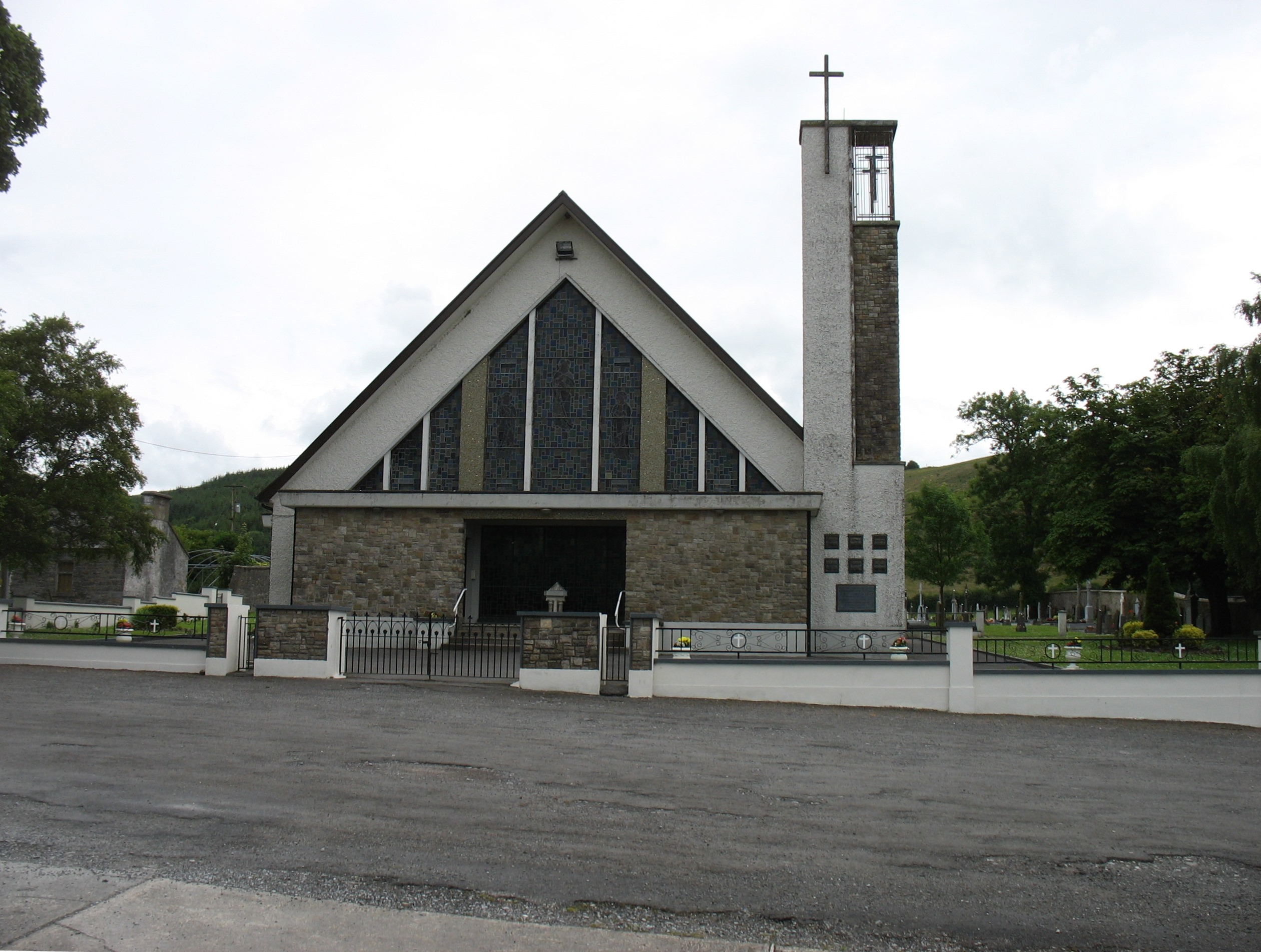
- Church of St. Patrick & St. Oliver, Glengoole

- Location in Ireland
- Coordinates: 52°37′05″N 7°38′16″W
- Country: Ireland
- Province: Munster
- County: County Tipperary
- Elevation: 172 m (564 ft)
- Time zone: UTC+0 (WET)
  - Summer (DST): UTC-1 (IST (WEST))
- Irish Grid Reference: S245519

New Birmingham (known locally as Brimigim or Glengoole, Irish: Gleann an Ghuail) is a small village of approximately 20 houses, in the civil parish of Kilcooly, and the Catholic parish of Gortnahoe and Glengoole, in County Tipperary, Ireland. It is located approximately 15 kilometres from Thurles and also on the R689 regional road between Urlingford and Fethard. It is within the townland of Glengoole (from Irish Gleann an Ghuail, meaning 'glen of the coal'), and is in the barony of Slievardagh.

== History ==
New Birmingham was founded by Sir Vere Hunt (1761–1818), a wealthy and eccentric Anglo-Irish landowner, with the help of Fr. Michael Meighan, the local parish priest, in the early 1800s, for the workers in his coal mine at Glengoole. New Birmingham was a landlord-inspired creation whose location was chosen due to the site of a Catholic chapel. This new village was said to be very different from those established in Ulster in the early seventeenth century. In his diary, he records having laid out the street pattern in person. He also obtained a charter giving him the right to hold one or two markets and several fairs every year. Hunt evidently hoped to turn New Birmingham into a major manufacturing centre, with hopes to create a branch of the grand canal in order to transport coal to Dublin, but he failed in this aim, as he did in most of his business ventures, due to not having the financial necessities to build this town. Historian Gillian Darley has called New Birmingham an "industrial foundation which failed to prosper, [and] remained a straggling hamlet".

== In popular culture ==
The comedian Pat Shortt, from nearby Thurles, was inspired by New Birmingham for material on several occasions. He and Jon Kenny's characters, D'Unbelievables, were said to be from Glengoolie, taken from the regional name for New Birmingham, Glengoole. Residents of New Birmingham also inspired the pair for the names of their characters in a Lotto advertisement from 1998. The name for Shortt's character, Buddy Brennan (known for the catchphrase "that's right"), was taken from one of the proprietors of Brennan's (O Braonain's) pub in the town.

== See also ==
- List of towns and villages in the Republic of Ireland
