= Coccothraustes major =

Coccothraustes major Temporal range: Pliocene

Scientific classification
- Kingdom: Animalia
- Phylum: Chordata
- Class: Aves
- Order: Passeriformes
- Family: Fringillidae
- Subfamily: Carduelinae
- Genus: Coccothraustes
- Species: †C. major

Binomial name
- †Coccothraustes major Kessler, 2013

Extinct species of bird

Coccothraustes major is an extinct species of Coccothraustes that inhabited Hungary during the Neogene period.
