= Hugh Massy, 2nd Baron Massy =

Anglo-Irish peer and politician

Hugh Massy, 2nd Baron Massy (14 April 1733 – 10 May 1790) was an Anglo-Irish politician and peer.

Massy was the son of Hugh Massy, 1st Baron Massy and Mary Dawson.

Massy served as High Sheriff of County Limerick in 1765. He was elected to the Irish House of Commons as the Member of Parliament for Askeaton in 1776 and sat until 1783. He succeeded to his father's title on 30 January 1788.

He married Catherine Taylor, the daughter of Colonel Edward Taylor and Anne Maunsell, in September 1760. They had eight children. He was succeeded by his son, also Hugh. A daughter Jane married William Greene.. Another daughter Catherine married John Green of Graige, Co Limerick circa 17 September 1793

Parliament of Ireland
Preceded by Sir Joseph Hoare, 1st Baronet; Edward Spring	Member of Parliament for Askeaton; 1776–1783; With: Sir Joseph Hoare, 1st Baronet	Succeeded by Richard Griffith; Sir Joseph Hoare, 1st Baronet
Peerage of Ireland
Preceded by Hugh Massy	Baron Massy; 1788–1790	Succeeded by Hugh Massy
