= Alexander the Great, a Dramatic Poem =

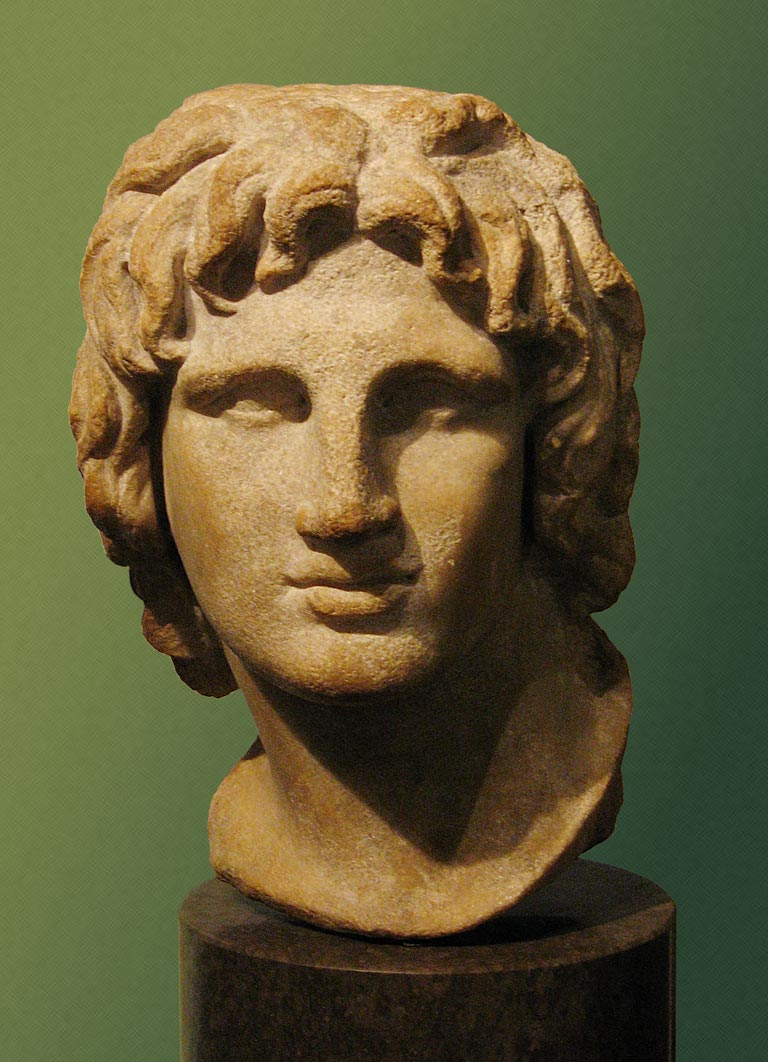
A bust of Alexander the Great

Alexander the Great, a Dramatic Poem is a work by Irish poet and playwright Aubrey Thomas de Vere. It was published in 1874 by Henry S. King and Co. It tells about Macedonian king Alexander the Great and his war against the Persians. The drama was dedicated "To the Memory of Coleridge". It is written in blank verse. There are more than 30 dramatis personae, to say nothing of anonymous soldiers and messengers. According to the authors of the 1911 Encyclopædia Britannica, the drama about Alexander the Great and the second work about St. Thomas of Canterbury "though they contain fine passages, suffer from diffuseness and a lack of dramatic spirit".
