= Lady Clara Vere de Vere =

Poem by Alfred, Lord Tennyson

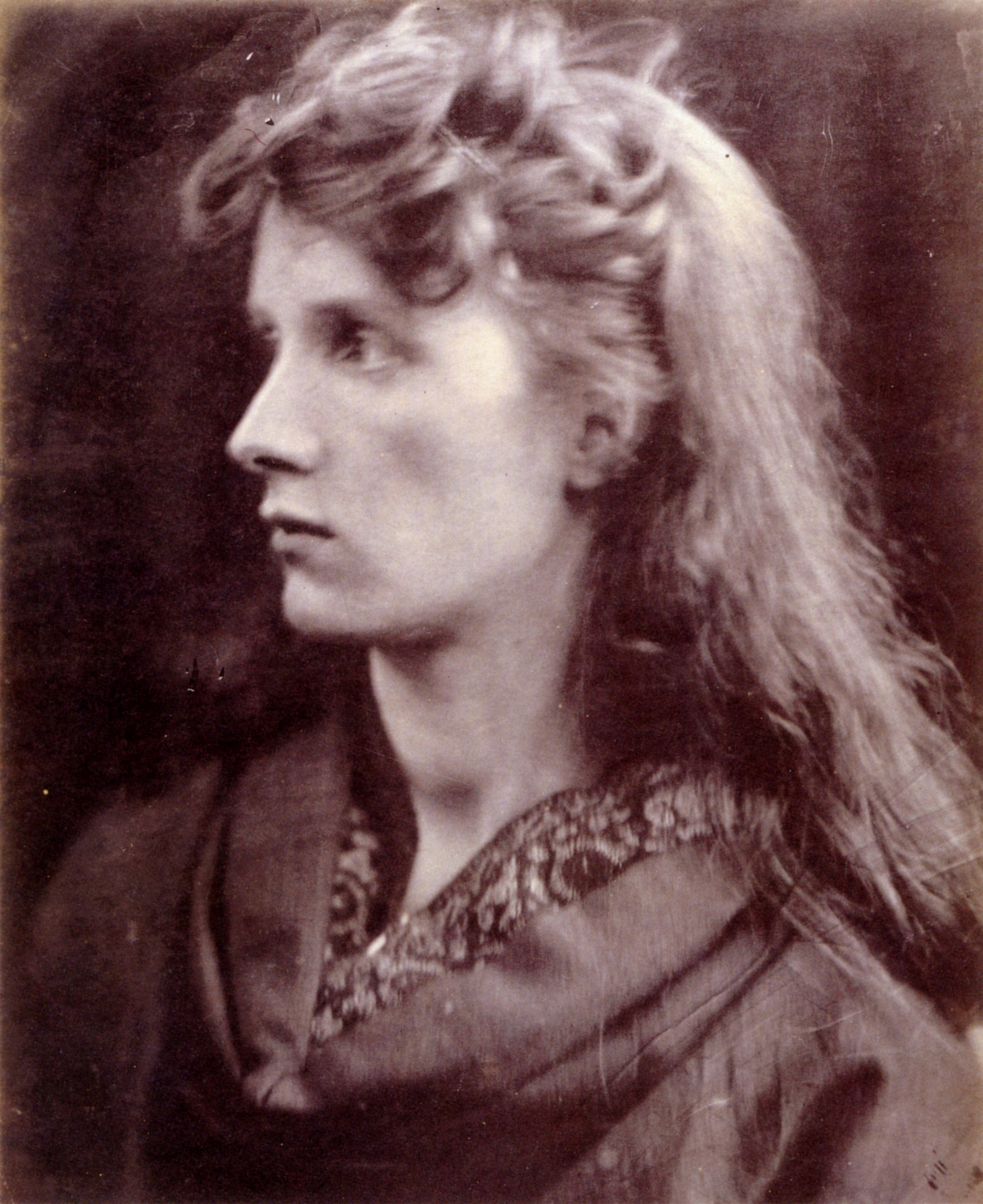
Mrs Keene as Lady Clara Vere de Vere. Photographed by Julia Margaret Cameron, 1866

"Lady Clara Vere de Vere" is an English poem written by Alfred Tennyson, part of his collected Poems published in 1842. The poem is about a woman in a family of aristocrats, and includes numerous references to nobility, such as to earls or coats of arms. One such line from the poem goes, "Kind hearts are more than coronets, and simple faith than Norman blood." This line gave the title to the film Kind Hearts and Coronets. Lewis Carroll's poem "Echoes" is based on "Lady Clare Vere de Vere".

Tennyson spent some time as a guest at Curragh Chase and wrote the poem to show his close friendship with the De Vere family. Despite this, the poem is a scathing rebuke. The speaker tells that Lady Clara has rebuffed a young, low-born man who loved her, and he died by suicide after her rejection. The references to coronets and earls are deployed ironically—the poem's speaker is not impressed with the Vere de Vere ancestry, and all of her noble claims cannot balance out Lady Clara's coldness, pride, and idleness (as proven by the fact that she apparently has no better claim on her time than breaking hearts). The poem's speaker then professes a more democratic viewpoint, where good character is earned by virtue, not by high birth.

== References in other works ==
- In J. M. Barrie's play What Every Woman Knows, "Vere de Vere" is referred to as a slightly cynical metaphor for "the noble nobility":

COMTESSE. It seems to be no joke to you, Mr. Shand. Sybil, my pet, are you to let him off?

SYBIL [flashing]. Let him off? If he wishes it. Do you?

JOHN [manfully]. I want it to go on. [Something seems to have caught in his throat: perhaps it is the impediment trying a temporary home.] It's the one wish of my heart. If you come with me, Sybil, I'll do all in a man's power to make you never regret it.

[Triumph of the Vere de Veres.]

- In C. J. Mathews' My Awful Dad (1881) the name Vere de Vere is used humorously as a stereotypical name of a member of the nobility: "You shall sit next to Evangeline Clara Vere de Vere, née Tadpole, the grand double-jointed sentimental comic clog and pump dancer."
- In the 1914 Angela Brazil story The Youngest Girl in the Fifth, chapter two, the second sentence is "She was tall for her age, and rather awkward in her manners, apt at present to be slapdash and independent, and decidedly lacking in 'that repose which stamps the caste of Vere de Vere'".
- In the 1917 P. G. Wodehouse short story The Romance of an Ugly Policeman, there is this passage:

"Ellen Brown was a nice girl, but she had a temper, and there were moments when her manners lacked rather noticeably the repose which stamps the caste of Vere de Vere."

- In the story "William Spoils the Party" – included in the 1925 collection Still William by Richmal Crompton – there is a reference to Mr. Bott (the self-made man in the village who has become wealthy through his invention of a digestive sauce). Crompton summarises him thus: "Mr. Bott was 'self-made' and considering all things had made quite a decent job of himself, but his manners had not 'the repose that stamps the caste of Vere de Vere.'"
- The theme is alluded to in the fictional play Simple Hearts and Coronets, which is advertised as playing locally in the 1932 film The Water Gipsies which allegorically refers to the real film's plot.
- In Nancy Mitford's The Pursuit of Love, when the Hons secret society is first introduced in Chapter II, "Kind hearts are more than coronets, and simple faith than Norman blood" is quoted to emphasize eligibility for the Hons didn't depend on a noble bloodline.
