= Kilcornan =

Settlement and civil parish in County Limerick, Ireland

Kilcornan Cill Churnáin
- Civil Parish
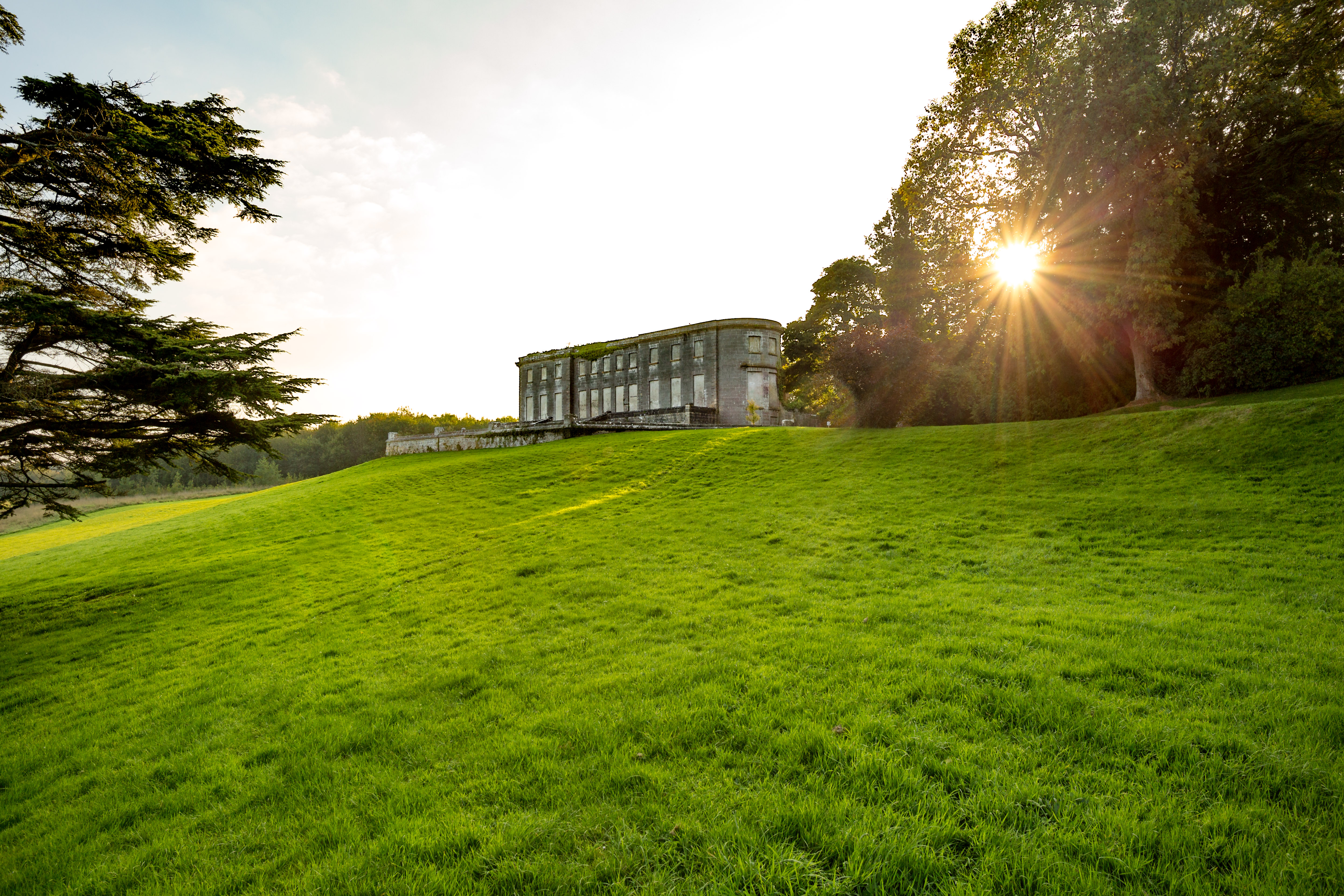
- Curraghchase Forest Park is in the civil parish of Kilcornan

- Location in Ireland
- Coordinates: 52°37′00″N 08°53′00″W
- Country: Ireland
- Province: Munster
- County: County Limerick

Population (2006)
  - Total: 671
- Time zone: UTC+0 (WET)
  - Summer (DST): UTC-1 (IST (WEST))

Kilcornan (Irish: Cill Churnáin) is a civil parish in County Limerick. It is 17 km west of Limerick city on the N69 road. According to the 2011 census of Ireland the population of the Kilcornan Electoral Division was 749, an increase of 11.6% since 2006. There is a Catholic church and a National School on the main road as well as a public house. Apart from Curraghchase, the ancestral home of the Victorian Poet Aubrey de Vere, the next most visited tourism site in Kilcornan is the Stonehall Visitor Park. There is also a go kart track. It is located across the River Shannon from Shannon Airport, County Clare.

== History ==
Lewis's Topographical Dictionary notes that the earliest identifiable settlements in Kilcornan were Danish. The lands changed hands several times during the Tudor era. A large part of the parish was granted to Hardress Waller, one of Cromwell's generals. Curraghchase, the ancestral home of Aubrey de Vere is in Kilcornan. The parish was known as Stonehall until 1961 when under Canon Bluet it changed names to Kilcornan. In 1551 the rector of the parish, William Casey, was nominated by James, the Earl of Desmond to be the first non-Catholic bishop of Limerick. In 1659 the census counted 299 people in the parish, 291 Irish and 8 English. It is part of the Barony of Kenry.

Killeen Cowpark was built in the 15th century.

== People ==
- Ger McDonnell, mountaineer and engineer, was born in Kilcornan. As the first Irishman to summit K2 in August 2008, he went missing along with 10 others on the descent. In the worst single accident in the history of K2 mountaineering, all were later confirmed dead.
- Aubrey Thomas de Vere (1814–1902), poet and critic, was born in Kilcornan

== See also ==
- List of Civil Parishes of Ireland
