= Hoare baronets of Annabella (1784) =

Escutcheon of the Hoare baronets of Annabella

The Hoare baronetcy, of Annabella in the County of Cork, was created in the Baronetage of Ireland on 10 December 1784 for Joseph Hoare. He represented Askeaton in the Irish House of Commons for many years. He voted against the Act of Union in 1800 at the age of over 90.

The 2nd Baronet sat as a member of the Irish Parliament for Carlow.

== Hoare baronets, of Annabella (1784) ==
- Sir Joseph Hoare, 1st Baronet (1707–1801)
- Sir Edward Hoare, 2nd Baronet (1745–1814)
- Sir Joseph Wallis Hoare, 3rd Baronet (1773–1852)
- Sir Edward Hoare, 4th Baronet (1801–1882)
- Sir Joseph Wallis O'Bryen Hoare, 5th Baronet, KGStJ (1828–1904)
- Sir Sydney James O'Bryen Hoare, 6th Baronet (1860–1933)
- Sir Edward O'Bryen Hoare, 7th Baronet (1898–1969)
- Sir Timothy Edward Charles Hoare, 8th Baronet, OStJ (1934–2008)
- Sir Charles James Hoare, 9th Baronet, CStJ (born 1971).

The heir apparent is Edward Harry William Hoare (born 2006), the present baronet's only son.
