= Richard Griffith (politician) =

Irish politician

Member of Parliament for Askeaton
- In office 1783–1790

Personal details
- Born: June 10, 1752
- Died: June 30, 1820 (aged 68)
- Spouse(s): Charity Yorke Bramston; Mary Hussey Burgh
- Children: Sir Richard Griffith, 1st Baronet; Arthur Hill Griffith
- Parent(s): Richard Griffith; Elizabeth Griffith
- Profession: Politician

Richard Griffith, MP (10 June 1752 – 30 June 1820) was an Irish politician.

== Biography ==
He was the only son of Richard Griffith of Maiden Hall, County Kilkenny, (1714–1788), and his wife and cousin, the novelist Elizabeth Griffith. Griffith served as the Member of Parliament for Askeaton in the Irish House of Commons between 1783 and 1790.

He was twice wed; first, to Charity Yorke Bramston, daughter of John Bramston of Oundle, with whom he had Sir Richard Griffith, 1st Baronet; she died in June 1789.

On 24 February 1793, he married Mary (died 10 September 1820), daughter of Walter Hussey Burgh, Chief Baron of the Irish Exchequer, and Anne de Burgh, with whom he had Arthur Hill Griffith (1810–1881), an attorney.

Arthur Hill Griffith fathered numerous children with his second wife, Hannah Rose Cottingham (1826–1921), including:

- Edward Arthur Griffith (1857–1949), mining attorney, whose descendants include the son of Lucy Griffith Paré and Canadian mining engineer Al Paré, Jules-Arthur Paré (1917–2013), who was Professor Emeritus of McGill University Faculty of Medicine, and their great-granddaughter, actress Jessica Paré. (Al Paré's father, a physician, was one of three siblings who had each married a sibling of a prominent Canadian mining family, for whom Timmins, Ontario was named by Al Paré, in 1912, in honour of his uncle, Noah Timmins.)

- Christopher Arthur Griffith (1858–1949), physician.

- Arthur Hill Griffith, attorney and politician for whom Griffith, New South Wales is named, and whose children included Wing Commander Sturt de Burgh Griffith (1905–1979), an engineer, patent attorney, and journalist.

In 1871, the family emigrated to Melbourne, Australia, from County Westmeath, Ireland.

Parliament of Ireland
Preceded by Joseph Hoare; Hon. Hugh Massy	Member of Parliament for Askeaton; 1783–1790; With: Joseph Hoare	Succeeded by Joseph Hoare; Henry Alexander
