= Sir Aubrey de Vere, 2nd Baronet =

Anglo-Irish poet and landowner

Sir Aubrey de Vere Bt

Personal details
- Born: Aubrey Hunt; August 28, 1788
- Died: July 5, 1846 (aged 57)
- Spouse: Mary Spring de Vere (née Rice)
- Children: Sir Aubrey de Vere, 3rd Baronet; Sir Stephen Edward De Vere, 4th Baronet; Aubrey Thomas de Vere; Three unnamed daughters
- Parents: Sir Vere Hunt, 1st Baronet (father); Eleanor Pery (mother)

Military service
- Allegiance: Kingdom of Great Britain
- Branch/service: British Army
- Years of service: 1793
- Rank: Captain
- Commands: Unnamed volunteer regiment
- Battles/wars: French Revolutionary Wars (Note: See his father's article for further clarification.)

Sir Aubrey de Vere, 2nd Baronet (born Aubrey Hunt, 28 August 1788 – 5 July 1846) was an Anglo-Irish poet and landowner.

== Biography ==
De Vere was the son of Sir Vere Hunt, 1st Baronet and Eleanor Pery, daughter of William Pery, 1st Baron Glentworth and his first wife Jane Walcott. He was educated at Harrow School, where he was a childhood friend of Lord Byron, and Trinity College, Dublin. He married Mary Spring Rice, the daughter of Stephen Edward Rice and Catherine Spring, and sister of Thomas Spring Rice, 1st Baron Monteagle of Brandon, in 1807. He succeeded to his father's title in 1818. He and Mary had five sons, including the third and fourth baronets, Aubrey and Stephen de Vere, and the poet Aubrey Thomas de Vere, and three daughters, two of whom died in infancy.

The Hunt/de Vere family estate for 300 years (1657–1957), including the period of the de Vere Baronetcy of Curragh, is the present-day Curraghchase Forest Park, in County Limerick. De Vere spent most of his life on the estate and was closely involved in its management. He suffered much trouble from his ownership of the island of Lundy, which his father, who was a notoriously poor businessman, had unwisely purchased in 1802, and which became a heavy drain on the family's finances. Sir Vere was never able to find a purchaser for Lundy, and it took his son until 1834 (or 1830) to dispose of it.

Sir Aubrey stood for election in County Limerick as an independent candidate in the 1820 General Election and came in third with 2921 votes.

He changed his surname from Hunt to de Vere on 15 March 1832, in reference to his Earl of Oxford ancestors, dating back to Aubrey de Vere I, a tenant-in-chief in England of William the Conqueror in 1086. He served as High Sheriff of County Limerick in 1811.

Sir Aubrey was a poet. Wordsworth called his sonnets the most perfect of the age. These and his drama, Mary Tudor: An Historical Drama, were published by his son the poet Mr. Aubrey Thomas de Vere in 1875 and 1884.

== Works ==
De Vere produced numerous works over his lifetime. The most notable are: Ode to the Duchess of Angouleme (1815), Julian the Apostate: A Dramatic Poem (1822), The Duke of Mercia: An Historical Drama [with] The Lamentation of Ireland, and Other Poems (1823), A Song of Faith: Devout Exercises and Sonnets and his most famous work, Mary Tudor: An Historical Drama.

Baronetage of Ireland
Preceded by Vere Hunt	Baronet (of Curragh); 1818–1846	Succeeded by Aubrey de Vere
