= Killeen Cowpark =

- Cillín Pháirc na mBó
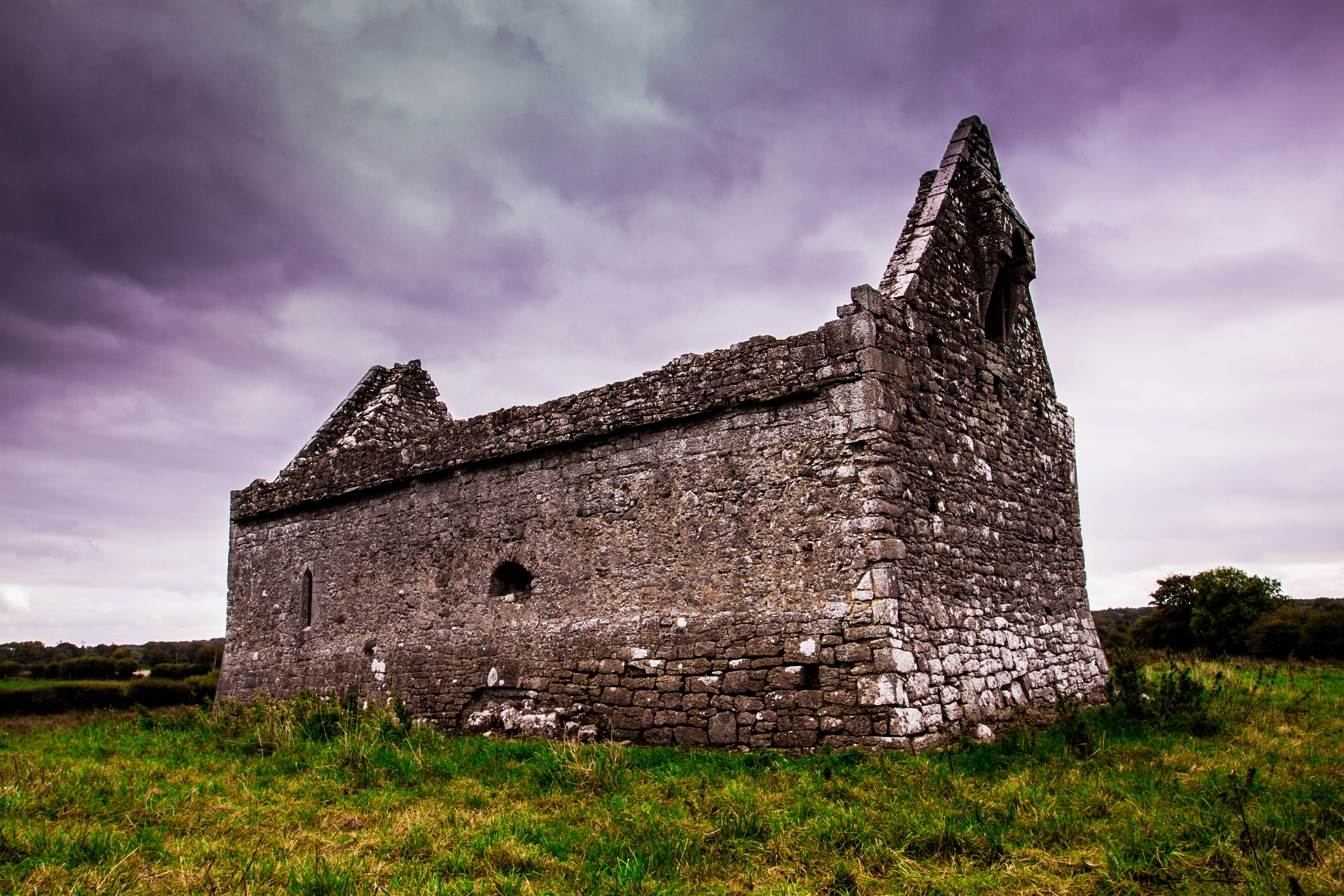

- Location within Ireland
- 52.607938°N 8.893816°W
- Location: Cowpark, Kilcornan, County Limerick
- Country: Ireland
- Denomination: Catholic (pre-Reformation)

Architecture
- Functional status: inactive
- Years built: 15th century

Specifications
- Length: 13.7 m (45 ft)
- Width: 7.3 m (24 ft)
- Materials: stone, mortar

Administration
- Diocese: Limerick
Designations
National monument of Ireland
- Official name: Killeen Cowpark
- Reference no.: 345

Killeen Cowpark is a medieval church and a National Monument in County Limerick, Ireland.

== Location ==
Killeen Cowpark is located 5.2 km (3.2 mi) east of Askeaton.

== History ==
Killeen Cowpark was built in the 15th century. It was in use until 1811. It was repaired in the 1930s under the direction of Canon Wall.

== Church ==
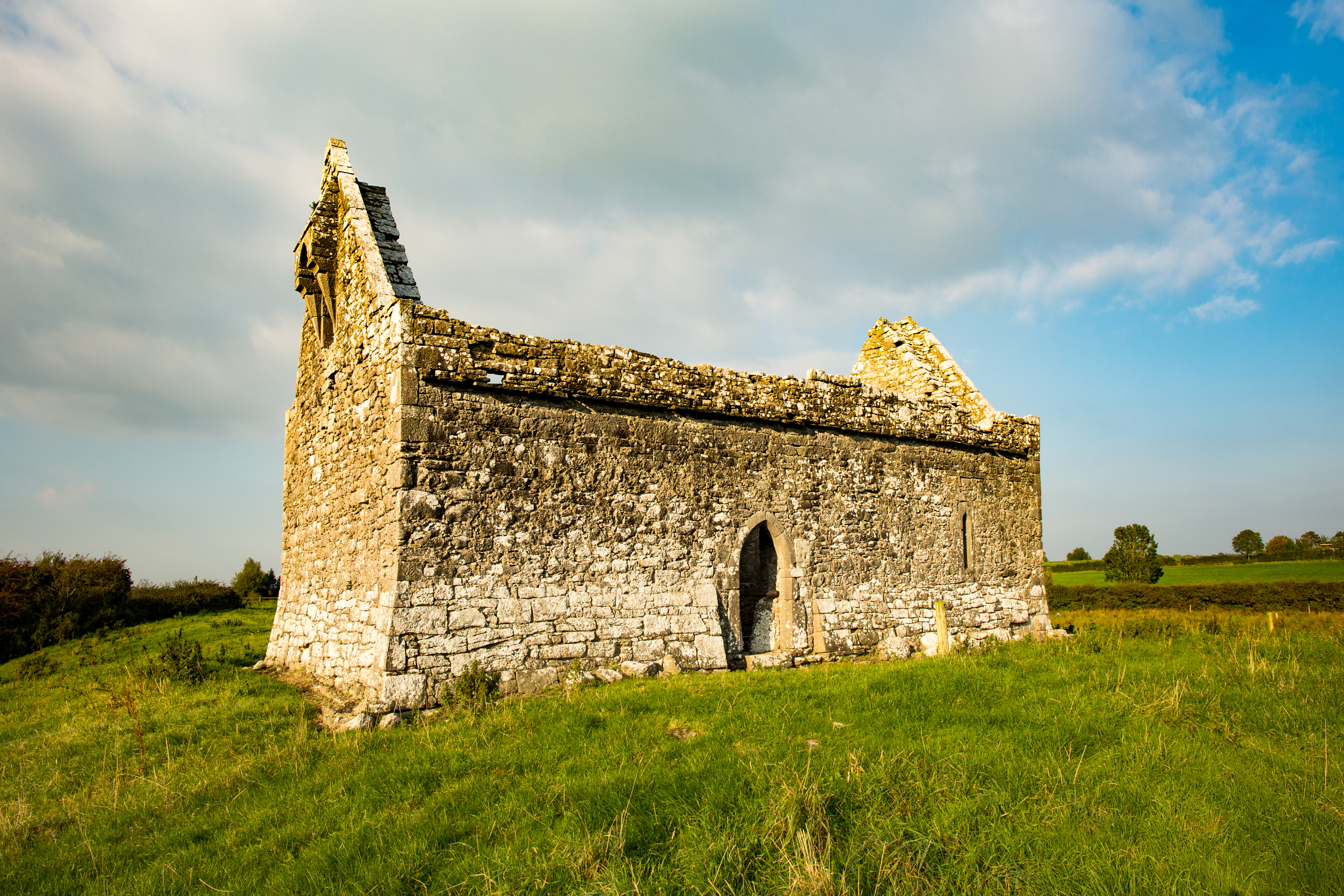
Another view of the building

Killeen Cowpark is an unadorned rectangular church. It has narrow windows and a turret-like belfry.
