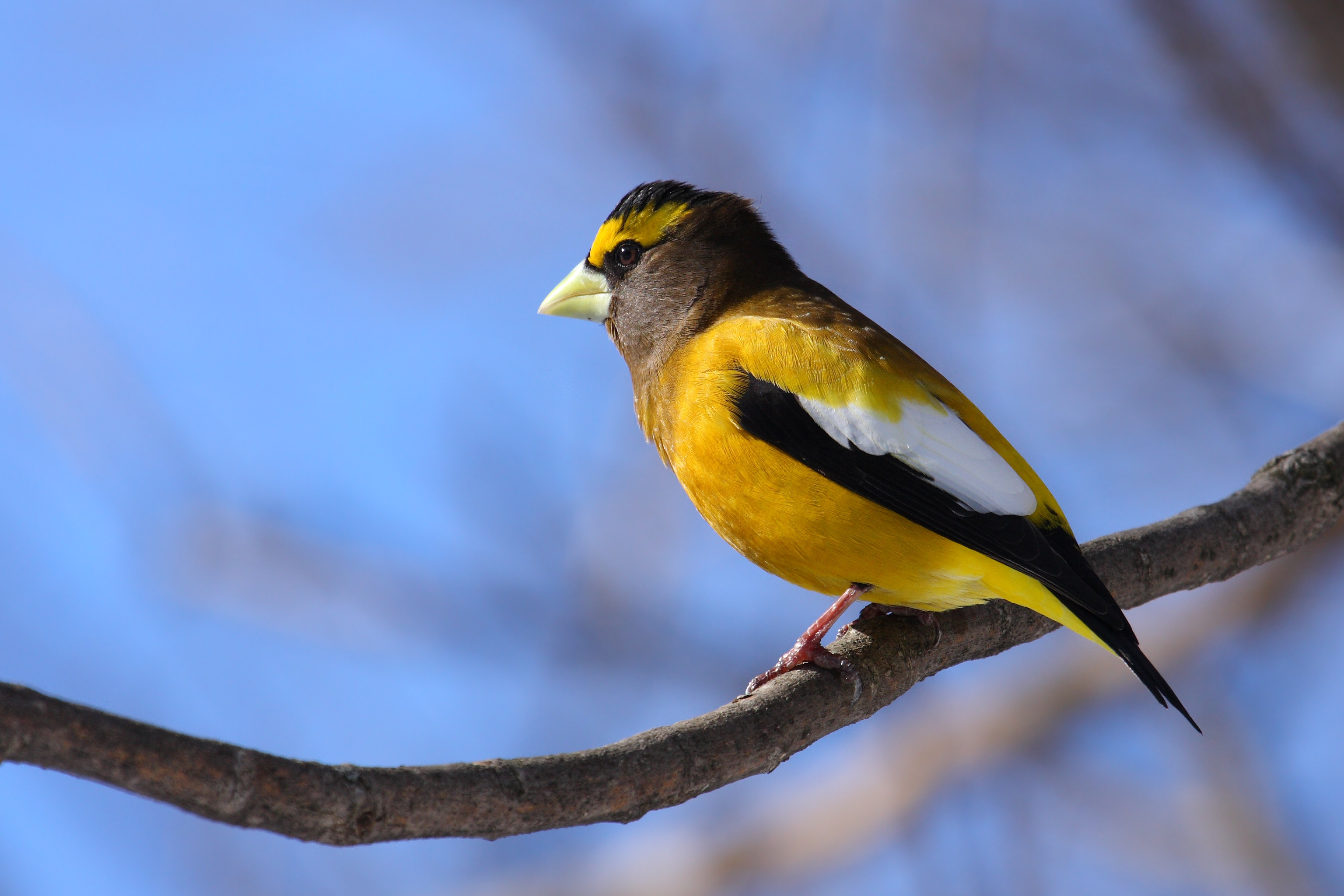
- Male evening grosbeak

Scientific classification
- Kingdom: Animalia
- Phylum: Chordata
- Class: Aves
- Order: Passeriformes
- Family: Fringillidae
- Subfamily: Carduelinae
- Genus: Hesperiphona; Bonaparte, 1850

Type species
- Fringilla vespertina Cooper, W, 1825

= Hesperiphona =

Genus of birds

Hesperiphona is a genus in the finch family Fringillidae.

The genus was introduced in 1850 by the French naturalist Charles Lucien Bonaparte with the evening grosbeak as the type species. The name combines the Ancient Greek hesperos meaning "evening" and phōnē meaning "sound" or "cry".

The genus contains the following two species:

Image	Scientific name	Common name	Distribution
	Hesperiphona vespertina	Evening grosbeak	Canada and the western mountainous areas of the United States and Mexico
	Hesperiphona abeillei	Hooded grosbeak	Central America, principally in Mexico and Guatemala.
