= James Graham Cooper =

American surgeon and naturalist (1830-1902)

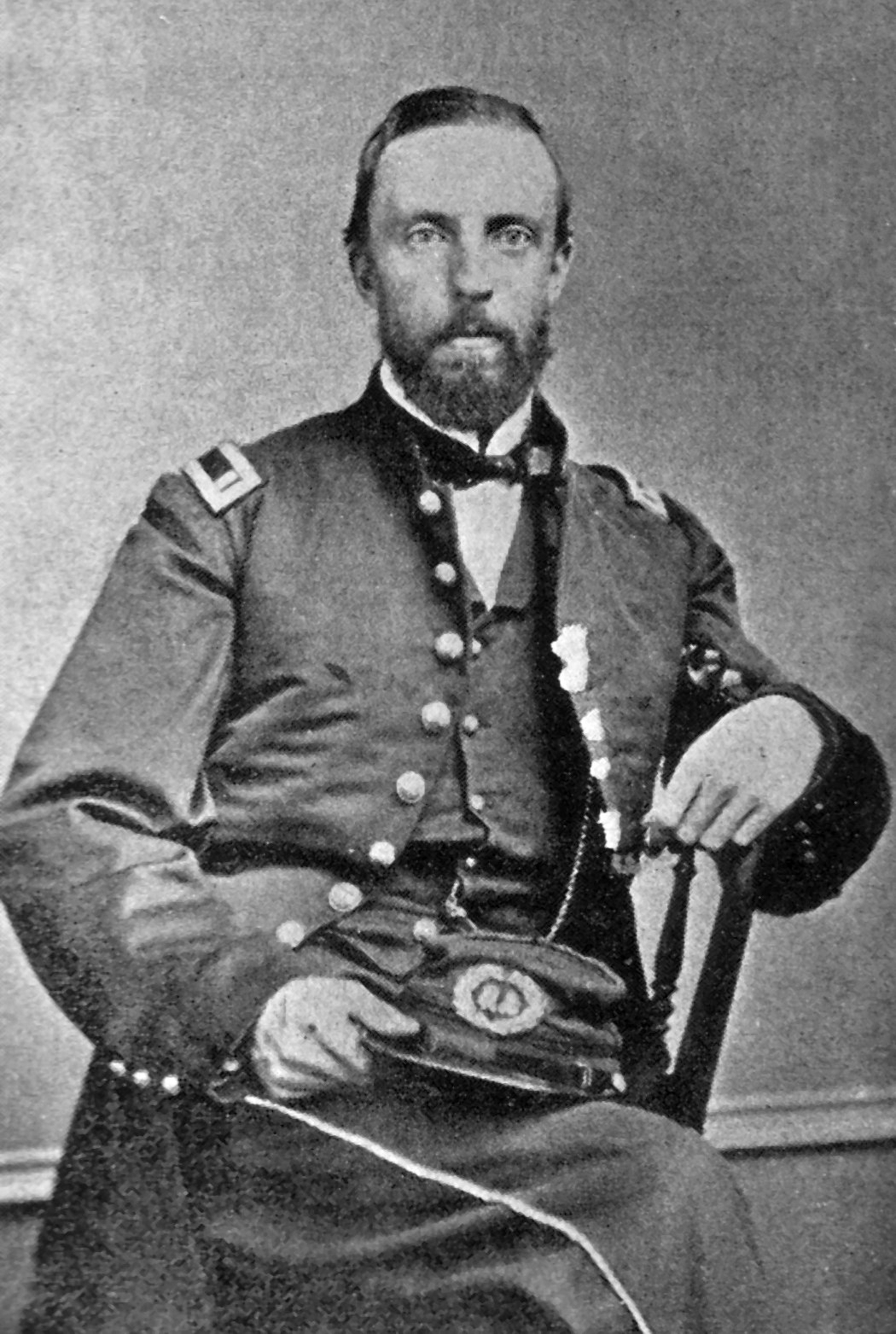
- Born: June 19, 1830; New York
- Died: July 19, 1902 (aged 72)
- Father: William Cooper
- Scientific career
- Fields: Surgeon and naturalist
- Institutions: California Geological Survey, California Academy of Sciences
- Patrons: Spencer F. Baird
- Author abbrev. (botany): J.G.Cooper
- Author abbrev. (zoology): Cooper, J.G.Cooper

James Graham Cooper (June 19, 1830 – July 19, 1902) was an American surgeon and naturalist.

Cooper was born in New York. He worked for the California Geological Survey (1860–1874) with Josiah Dwight Whitney, William Henry Brewer and Henry Nicholas Bolander. He was primarily a zoologist, but he also made significant botanical collections from San Diego to Fort Mohave, Arizona in 1861. Cooper was active in the California Academy of Sciences, eventually becoming Director of the Museum.

He obtained his medical degree in 1851 and practiced in New York City until 1853. Spencer F. Baird, the Assistant Secretary of the Smithsonian Institution at that time, helped Cooper work with the Pacific railroad survey parties working in the Washington Territory. He joined this survey under Captain George McClellan as a surgeon until 1854. In 1855 he visited San Francisco and the Panama Isthmus. He collected many birds during this expedition.

In 1860, he returned west and joined the Blake Expedition that went from St. Louis up to the Missouri River and into Idaho and Washington. He worked as a contract surgeon for brief periods with the US Army and Josiah Whitney, the chief of the California Geological Survey. Along with Baird he wrote a book on the birds of California "Ornithology, Volume I, Land Birds" in 1870.

His marriage in 1866 made it difficult for him to balance his interest in natural history. He worked in San Mateo, Oakland, and San Francisco and finally settled in 1875 in Hayward. He wrote on his difficulties in a letter in 1870

In this country, like most others, the pursuit of science as a private business is a losing game ... Almost all the 'enlightened' people of this city know me as a 'naturalist,' which is the title of all the taxidermists also, and ... they avoid employing me professionally as they would a bird-stuffer. The consequence is that ... my patients are among the poor and ignorant, who don't know much about me and don't pay either ... My time is much taken up now in running about trying to raise money enough to pay expenses ... As I am not worse off than most other naturalists, I ought not to complain, I suppose, ... Hoping you may not get down to my condition (the best of wishes), I remain, ...

His father William Cooper was also a naturalist.

== See also ==
- Category:Taxa named by James Graham Cooper
