= Sir Joseph Hoare, 1st Baronet =

Anglo-Irish politician

Sir Joseph Hoare, 1st Baronet (25 December 1707 – 24 December 1801) was an Anglo-Irish politician.

Hoare was the son of Edward Hoare, the Member of Parliament for Cork, and Grace Burton. His family had settled in Ireland during the early part of the seventeenth century and became prosperous merchants and bankers, who founded Hoare's Bank.

Hoare was educated in law and practised as a barrister in Ireland. He was elected to the Irish House of Commons as the MP for Askeaton in 1761. He held the office for an unusually long period of time, sitting until 1800, when the seat was disenfranchised following the Acts of Union 1800 when the Parliament of Ireland was dissolved. He was created a baronet, of Annabella in the Baronetage of Ireland on 10 December 1784. He passionately opposed the union between the Kingdom of Ireland and the Kingdom of Great Britain and spoke at length against it in the House of Commons, despite being ninety years old at the time. He died shortly thereafter.

He married Catherine Somerville, the daughter of Sir James Somerville, 1st Baronet. Together they had four children. He was succeeded by his only son, Edward.

Parliament of Ireland
Preceded by Edmond Malone; Edward Taylor	Member of Parliament for Askeaton; 1761–1800; With: James Cotter (1761–1768); Edward Spring (1768–1776); Hon. Hugh Massy (1776–1783); Richard Griffith (1783–1790); Henry Alexander (1790–1798); John Stewart (1798); Sir Vere Hunt, Bt (1798–1800)	Parliament of the United Kingdom
Baronetage of Ireland
New creation	Baronet (of Annabella); 1784–1801	Succeeded by Edward Hoare
