= Curraghchase Forest Park =

Leisure facility with archaeological monuments

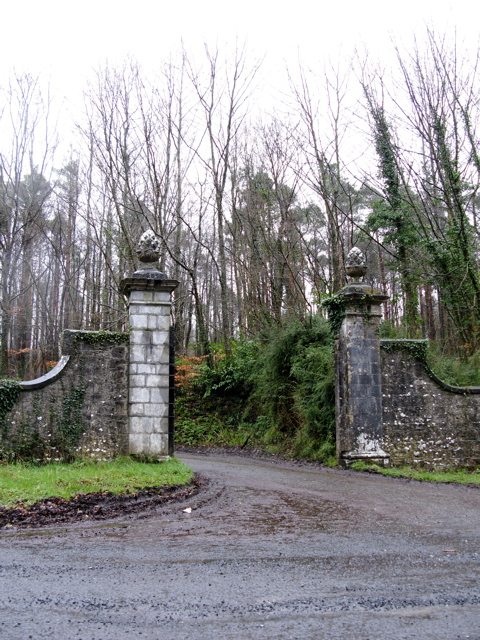
- Entrance

- Location within Ireland
- Location: Kilcornan, Limerick, Ireland
- Coordinates: 52°35′40″N 8°52′15″W
- Area: 774 acres (313 ha)
- Governing body: Coillte

Curraghchase is a 774-acre (3 km^{2}) forest park located in County Limerick. It is 20 km from the city of Limerick, between the towns of Adare and Askeaton. The land was the Hunt/de Vere family estate for 300 years (1657–1957), including the period of the de Vere baronets, also serving as the home of renowned poet and critic Aubrey Thomas De Vere.

== Archaeology ==
In the park area, there are 8 classified sites; 1 cairn, 2 enclosures, 3 ringforts, 1 standing stone and the 18th-century house probably built on the site of Curragh Castle which is mentioned in Desmond Roll.

== Environment ==
The park consists of mainly broadleaf and mixed woodland with some mature conifer stands, and parkland with some of the area underwater. The woods occur on low limestone ridges. Conservation of rare Yew (Taxus Baccata) core area has also been ongoing together with other conservation initiatives including the development of a new Summer Bat Roost area for the Lesser Horseshoe Bat. The hawfinch, generally a very scarce bird in Ireland, is a regular winter visitor, forming flocks of between 15 and 30 birds, and the brambling is also a frequent winter visitor.

== History ==
Curragh House (Curraghchase explained below) was built in 1657 by Vere Hunt, an officer in Oliver Cromwell's army and a descendant of the Earl of Oxford, who traced their lineage to Aubrey de Vere I, a tenant-in-chief in England of William the Conqueror in 1086. Hunt was granted the land, which consisted of 380 acres (1.5 km^{2}) originally owned by John Fitzgerald, as one of the Cromwellian plantations.

The estate remained home of the Hunt/De Vere family for over 300 years. The existing house dates from the early nineteenth century, rebuilt by Sir Aubrey (Hunt) de Vere, 2nd Baronet.

The estate was originally called Curragh (meaning 'marshy plain' in Irish). When the 2nd Baronet changed his surname by royal licence to de Vere in 1833 to reflect his de Veres of Oxford lineage, he also changed the name of the property from Curragh to Curraghchase. The 2nd Baronet was a noted poet, and his third son, Aubrey Thomas De Vere, is a renowned poet and critic.

The younger Aubrey recalled that the lake at the bottom of the house was a rich meadow when he was in his youth. A slender stream divided this meadow. Across the lake, a monument to the de Vere family stands on a small hill. Near the house, there is a small cemetery for the de Vere's family pets.

Tennyson spent some time as a guest at Curraghchase and wrote the poem Lady Clara Vere de Vere to show his close friendship with the family.

The house was accidentally destroyed by fire in December 1941. The grounds at Curraghchase were bought by the State in 1957 and the property is now used as commercial timber. Some of the state forest is used as a public amenity and includes tourist trails, camping and caravan park facilities, which make the area a popular tourist attraction.

== Lady of the Lake legend ==
On the eastern side of the house is an artificial lake. Historic maps display a Lady's Island within this lake. During a visit, Tennyson told of seeing the mystic arm of the Lady of the Lake thrust above the waters. A century later during a Christmas party at the house, rose a cry of acute anguish and of such force that even above a storm occupants of the room heard it distinctly. Looking out to the lake they saw a figure of a woman, redly aglow as if sheathed and point with arm outstretched, toward Curragh Chase. It was this storm that caused a limb to crash through one of the windows, knocking over candelabra and creating a fire that destroyed the house. On every Christmas Eve thereafter, the burning figure of a woman was seen floating on the waters of the lake.

== Other notable people born here ==
Henry Hunt (1707–1796), the first to hold the titles of state apothecary and governor of the Apothecaries Hall of Ireland (son of John "of Glangoole" Hunt and his second wife Margaret Bowles).

Contra Burke's Landed Gentry, his wife was Elizabeth Kiernan married in 1742 rather than Grace Forsyth in 1747 As state apothecary, he was succeeded by his son James, his nephew George Kiernan followed by Thomas Hunt. James and George also served terms as governor.
