= 135th Illinois Infantry Regiment =

- Active: June 6–September 28, 1864
- Disbanded: September 28, 1864
- Country: United States
- Allegiance: Union
- Branch: Infantry
- Size: Regiment
- Engagements: American Civil War

Commanders
- Colonel: John S. Wolfe

The 135th Illinois Infantry Regiment was an infantry regiment from Illinois that served in the Union Army between June 6 and September 28, 1864, during the American Civil War.

== Service ==
The regiment was organized at Mattoon, Illinois, with a strength of 852 men, and mustered in for one-hundred-day service on June 6, 1864. On June 10, the regiment departed for Benton Barracks, Missouri, where they reported to General William Rosecrans.

From there five companies of the regiment were stationed on the Iron Mountain railroad. Three companies of the regiment were stationed at the Gasconade railroad crossing and a further two companies stationed at the Osage railroad crossing of the Missouri Pacific Railroad and at Jefferson City, Missouri. The regiment was mustered out on September 28, 1864. During its service the regiment lost one man at Gasconade crossing and sixteen men to disease. (Note: According to Frederick H. Dyers' (1959) A Compendium of the War of the Rebellion Compendium set, the regiment had two men killed and seventeen men died of disease.)

== See also ==
- List of Illinois Civil War Units

== Bibliography ==
- Dyer, Frederick H. (1959). A Compendium of the War of the Rebellion. New York and London. Thomas Yoseloff, Publisher. LCCN 59-12963.
- Reece. Brigadier General J.N. (1900). The Report of Illinois from Military and Naval Department of the Adjutant General of the State of Illinois. Containing Reports for the Years 1861–1866. Springfield, Illinois. Journal Company, Printers and Binders.
