= William Cooper (conchologist) =

American conchologist, naturalist and collector

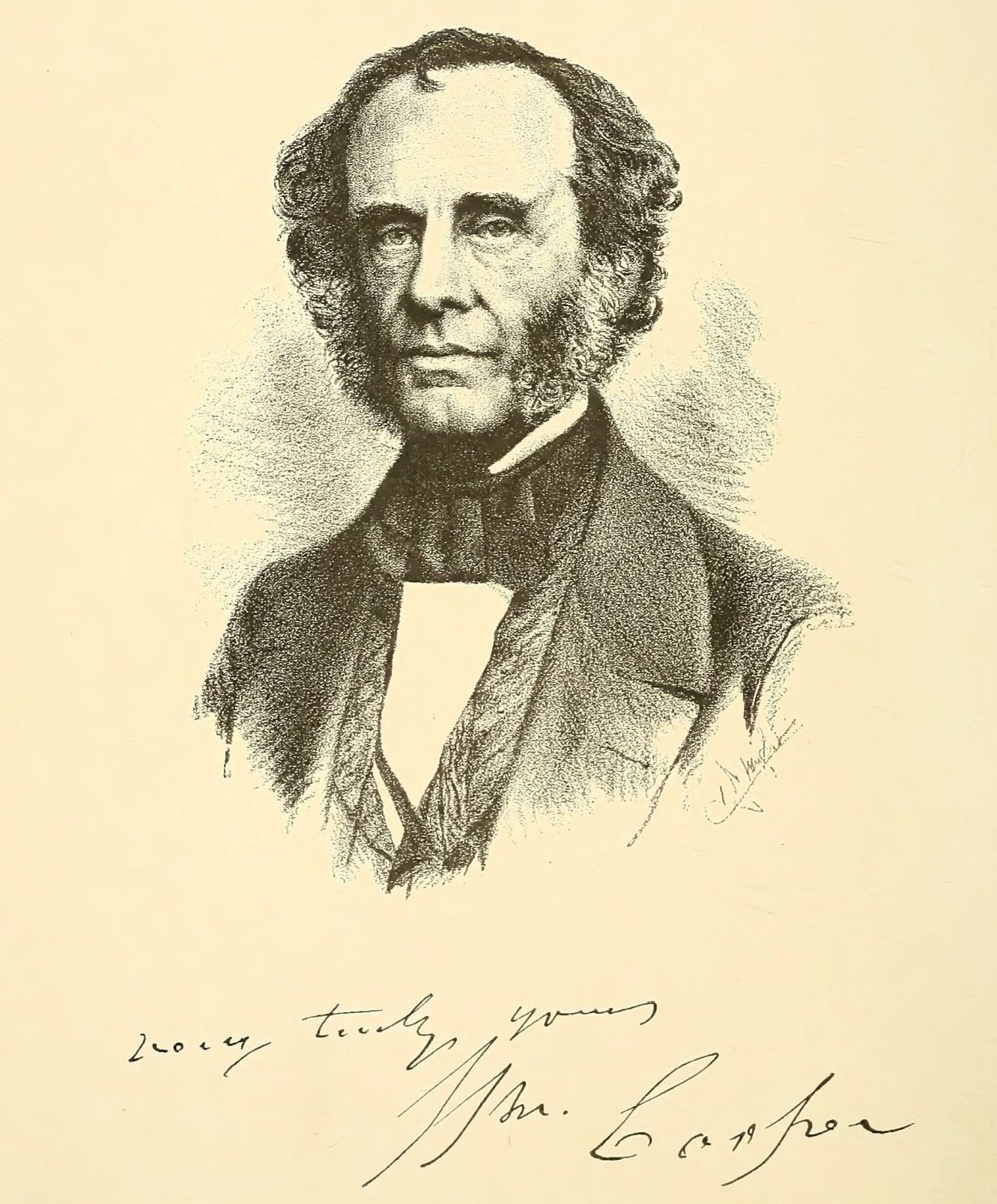
- William Cooper portrait from "Biographical Sketch of the Late William Cooper of Hudson County, New Jersey" (1864)
- Born: 1798
- Died: 1864 (aged 65–66)
- Known for: Collecting shells
- Children: James Graham Cooper
- Scientific career
- Fields: Conchologist, collector
- Author abbrev. (botany): W.Cooper
- Author abbrev. (zoology): Cooper; W. Cooper

William Cooper (1798–1864) was an American naturalist, conchologist (shell zoologist) and collector.

== Early life ==
Cooper studied zoology in Europe from 1821 to 1824, and afterwards travelled to Nova Scotia, Kentucky and the Bahamas collecting specimens.

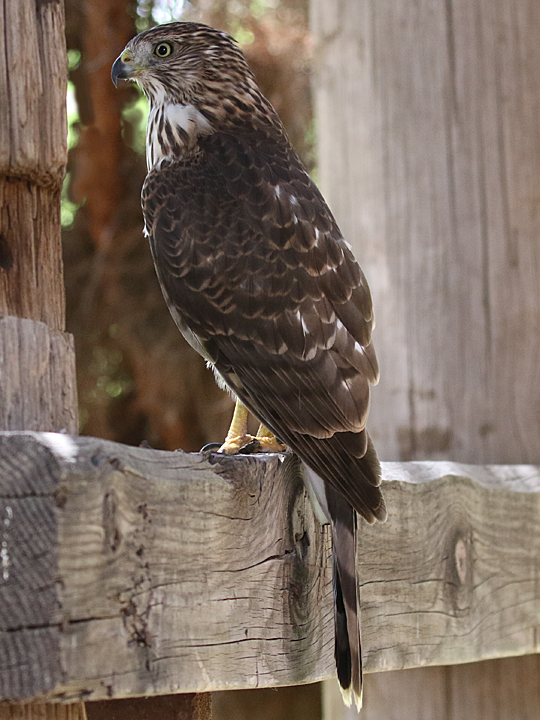
Cooper's Hawk

== Career ==
Although he was not an author himself his specimens were of great help to others, such as John James Audubon, Charles Lucien Bonaparte and Thomas Nuttall.

Cooper was one of the founders of the New York Lyceum of Natural History (later the New York Academy of Sciences), and the first American member of the Zoological Society of London. Bonaparte named Cooper's hawk for him, after Cooper collected a specimen of it in 1828.

== Personal life ==
He was father of James Graham Cooper (1830–1902) a physician and famous naturalist in his own right.
