= Aubrey Thomas de Vere =

Irish poet & cleric (1814–1902)

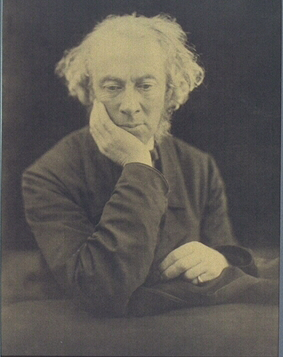
- Aubrey Thomas de Vere
- Born: 10 January 1814; Curraghchase House, Curraghchase, Kilcornan, County Limerick, Ireland
- Died: 20 January 1902 (aged 88); Curraghchase, Kilcornan, County Limerick, Ireland
- Occupation: Author
- Parents: Sir Aubrey de Vere, 2nd Baronet; Mary Spring de Vere (née Rice)
- Relatives: Sir Aubrey de Vere, 3rd Baronet; Sir Stephen Edward De Vere, 4th Baronet (brothers); Lord Monteagle (uncle); Lucy Knox (cousin)
- Writing career
- Notable works: In verse: The Sisters (1861); The Infant Bridal (1864); Irish Odes (1869); Legends of St Patrick (1872); Alexander the Great (1874); St Thomas of Canterbury (1876); Legends of the Saxon Saints (1879); In prose: Essays Chiefly on Poetry (1887); Essays Chiefly Literary and Ethical (1889)

Academic background
- Education: Trinity College, Dublin
- Influences: Lord Byron; William Wordsworth; Sir William Rowan Hamilton; John Henry Newman

Aubrey Thomas de Vere (10 January 1814 – 20 January 1902) was an Irish poet and critic.

== Life ==
Aubrey Thomas Hunt de Vere was born at Curraghchase House (now in ruins) at Curraghchase, Kilcornan, County Limerick, the third son of Sir Aubrey de Vere, 2nd Baronet (1788–1846) and his wife Mary Spring Rice, daughter of Stephen Edward Rice (d.1831) and Catherine Spring, of Mount Trenchard, County Limerick. He was a nephew of Lord Monteagle, a younger brother of Sir Stephen de Vere, 4th Baronet and a cousin of Lucy Knox. His sister Ellen married Robert O'Brien, the brother of William Smith O'Brien. In 1832, his father dropped the original surname 'Hunt' by royal licence, assuming the surname 'de Vere'.

The characteristics of Aubrey de Vere's poetry are high seriousness and a fine religious enthusiasm. His research in questions of faith led him to the Roman Catholic Church where in 1851 he was received into the Church by Cardinal Manning in Avignon. In many of his poems, notably in the volume of sonnets called St Peters Chains (1888), he made rich additions to devotional verse. For a few years he held a professorship, under Newman, in the Catholic University of Ireland in Dublin.

In "A Book of Irish Verse," W. B. Yeats described de Vere's poetry as having "less architecture than the poetry of Ferguson and Allingham, and more meditation. Indeed, his few but ever memorable successes are enchanted islands in gray seas of stately impersonal reverie and description, which drift by and leave no definite recollection. One needs, perhaps, to perfectly enjoy him, a Dominican habit, a cloister, and a breviary."

== Works ==
His best-known works are: in verse, The Sisters (1861); The Infant Bridal (1864); Irish Odes (1869); Legends of St Patrick (1872); and Legends of the Saxon Saints (1879); and in prose, "The Foray of Queen Meave and Other Legends of Ireland's Heroic Age" (1882), Essays Chiefly on Poetry (1887); and Essays Chiefly Literary and Ethical (1889). He also wrote a picturesque volume of travel-sketches, and two dramas in verse, Alexander the Great (1874); and St Thomas of Canterbury (1876). According to the Encyclopædia Britannica Eleventh Edition, both of these dramas, "though they contain fine passages, suffer from diffuseness and a lack of dramatic spirit." One of his best remembered poem is Inisfail while two of his historical poems used to be on the Junior Cycle English syllabus, The March to Kinsale and The Ballad of Athlone.

=== Influences ===
In his Recollections he says that Byron was his first admiration, but was instantly displaced when Sir Aubrey put Wordsworth's "Laodamia" into his hands. He became a disciple of Wordsworth, whose calm meditative serenity he often echoed with great felicity; and his affection for Greek poetry, truly felt and understood, gave dignity and weight to his own versions of mythological idylls. A critic in the Quarterly Review of 1896 said of his poetry, that next to Browning's it showed the fullest vitality, the largest sphere of ideas, covered the broadest intellectual field since Wordsworth.

- "May Carols and Legends of Saxon Saints" (1857)
- "Legends and Records of the Church and Empire" (1887)
- "Mediæval Records and Sonnets" (1898)

He will be remembered for the impulse which he gave to the study of Celtic legend and Celtic literature. In this direction he has had followers, who have sometimes assumed the appearance of pioneers; but after Matthew Arnold's lecture on Celtic Literature, nothing did more to help the Celtic revival than Aubrey de Vere's insight into the Irish character, and his stirring reproductions of the early Irish epic poetry. 0

A volume of Selections from his poems was edited in 1894 (New York and London) by G. E. Woodberry.

The de Vere Hunt Male line DNA

Several members of Aubrey's family from two brothers of his ancestor Captain Vere, namely those referred to as Henry "of LIgadoon" (1) and John " of Glangoole" Aubrey's ancestor (4) have determined that he belonged to the rare J-FTA83121 Hunt group and subsequently to the J-FTA84824 for John. In relation to other families, it points to Norman origin of the family via VIenne, originating from an ancient Jewish line via the Levant.
