= AD 135 =

135 in various calendars
Gregorian calendar	135; CXXXV
Ab urbe condita	888
Assyrian calendar	4885
Balinese saka calendar	56–57
Bengali calendar	−459 – −458
Berber calendar	1085
Buddhist calendar	679
Burmese calendar	−503
Byzantine calendar	5643–5644
Chinese calendar	甲戌年 (Wood Dog); 2832 or 2625 — to — 乙亥年 (Wood Pig); 2833 or 2626
Coptic calendar	−149 – −148
Discordian calendar	1301
Ethiopian calendar	127–128
Hebrew calendar	3895–3896
- Hindu calendars
Vikram Samvat	191–192
Shaka Samvat	56–57
Kali Yuga	3235–3236
Holocene calendar	10135
Iranian calendar	487 BP – 486 BP
Islamic calendar	502 BH – 501 BH
Javanese calendar	10–11
Julian calendar	135; CXXXV
Korean calendar	2468
Minguo calendar	1777 before ROC 民前1777年
Nanakshahi calendar	−1333
Seleucid era	446/447 AG
Thai solar calendar	677–678
Tibetan calendar	阳木狗年 (male Wood-Dog); 261 or −120 or −892 — to — 阴木猪年 (female Wood-Pig); 262 or −119 or −891

Year 135 (CXXXV) was a common year starting on Friday of the Julian calendar. At the time, it was known as the Year of the Consulship of Lupercus and Atilianus (or, less frequently, year 888 Ab urbe condita). The denomination 135 for this year has been used since the early medieval period, when the Anno Domini calendar era became the prevalent method in Europe for naming years.

== Events ==
=== By place ===
==== Roman Empire ====
- A Jewish diaspora begins, as Emperor Hadrian bars Jews from Jerusalem, and has survivors of the massacre dispersed across the Roman Empire. Many join Mediterranean ports.
- Jerusalem is renamed Colonia Aelia Capitolina, in honor of Hadrian. Legio VI Ferrata rebuilds the legionary fortress in the city, and constructs a Roman temple at Golgotha.
- An altar to Jupiter is erected, on the site of the Temple in Jerusalem.
- Canopus, Hadrian's Villa, Tivoli, Italy, is finished.
- Alans threaten Cappadocia; they are repulsed by Arrian.

==== Asia ====
- Last (4th) year of Yangjia era of the Chinese Han Dynasty.

=== By topic ===
==== Religion ====
- Marcus (or Mahalia) becomes bishop of Jerusalem (d. 156)

== Births ==
- Judah ha-Nasi, Talmudic scholar (according to Jewish tradition, he was born the same day Rabbi Akiva died a martyr's death) (d. 217)
- Sanabares, Indo-Parthian king (d. 160)

== Deaths ==
- Epictetus, Greek Stoic philosopher (b. AD 50)
- Rabbi Akiva, Jewish scholar and sage (b. AD 50)
- Rabbi Ishmael, Jewish scholar and lawmaker
- Simon bar Kokhba, Jewish military leader
