= 135th Ohio Infantry Regiment =

- Active: May 11, 1864, to September 1, 1864
- Country: United States
- Allegiance: Union
- Branch: Infantry
- Engagements: Battle of North Mountain

The 135th Ohio Infantry Regiment, sometimes 135th Ohio Volunteer Infantry (or 135th OVI) was an infantry regiment in the Union Army during the American Civil War.

== Service ==
The 135th Ohio Infantry was organized at Camp Chase in Columbus, Ohio, and mustered on May 11, 1864, for 100 days service under the command of Colonel Andrew Legg.

The regiment left Ohio for Cumberland, Maryland, May 11. It was assigned to duty as railroad guard on the Baltimore & Ohio Railroad at North Mountain, Opequan Station, and Martinsburg until July 3. At North Mountain, a portion of the regiment was captured and sent to Andersonville Prison. It participated in operations around Harpers Ferry July 4–7, and performed guard duty at Maryland Heights until September. Participated in the actions at Maryland Heights July 3–7.

The 135th Ohio Infantry mustered out of service at Camp Chase on September 1, 1864.

== Ohio National Guard ==
Over 35,000 Ohio National Guardsmen were federalized and organized into regiments for 100 days service in May 1864. Shipped to the Eastern Theater, they were designed to be placed in "safe" rear areas to protect railroads and supply points, thereby freeing regular troops for Lt. Gen. Ulysses S. Grant’s push on the Confederate capital of Richmond, Virginia. As events transpired, many units found themselves in combat, stationed in the path of Confederate Gen. Jubal Early’s veteran Army of the Valley during its famed Valley Campaigns of 1864. Ohio Guard units met the battle-tested foe head on and helped blunt the Confederate offensive thereby saving Washington, D.C. from capture. Ohio National Guard units participated in the battles of Monacacy, Fort Stevens, Harpers Ferry, and in the siege of Petersburg.

== Casualties ==
The regiment lost 73 men during service; 7 enlisted men killed or mortally wounded, 66 enlisted men due to disease.

== Commanders ==
- Colonel Andrew Legg

== See also ==
- List of Ohio Civil War units
- Ohio in the Civil War
