= 135th (Limerick) Regiment of Foot =

1796 British Army infantry regiment

The 135th (Limerick) Regiment of Foot was an infantry regiment of Fencibles in the British Army, created and promptly disbanded in 1796. The regiment, raised by Sir Vere Hunt, did not see any active service; it served solely to recruit soldiers. On disbandment, the recruits were drafted into other regiments. The regiment has the interesting historical distinction of having had the highest regimental number of any British line regiment.
