= Samuel Dennis Warren =

Samuel Dennis Warren may refer to:

- S. D. Warren, American paper magnate
- Samuel D. Warren II, American attorney
