= Norman Byrnes =

Norman Byrnes may refer to:

- Norman Byrnes (botanist) (1922–1998), Australian botanist
- Norman Byrnes (lawyer) (1922–2009), American attorney
