= Cornelia Warren =

American farmer and educational and social service philanthropist (1857–1921)

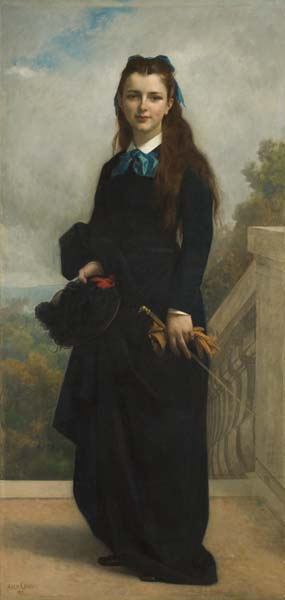
- 1871 painting by Alexandre Cabanel
- Born: Cornelia Lyman Warren; March 21, 1857; Waltham, Middlesex County, Massachusetts
- Died: June 4, 1921 (aged 64); Waltham, Middlesex County, Massachusetts
- Occupations: farmer, philanthropist
- Years active: 1880–1913

Cornelia Warren (March 21, 1857 – June 4, 1921) was an American farmer and an educational and social service philanthropist, widely known for her investment in social improvement projects. She was a trustee of Wellesley College, bought the location for Denison House and ran a model farm in Waltham, Massachusetts. She bequeathed her large estate to establish trust funds for maintaining hospitals, educational facilities, community projects and cultural venues in and around Boston, Massachusetts and Westbrook, Maine. She left Cedar Hill, the Warren family home and over 200 acres of land, to her brothers, if they wanted to live there, and if not, to the community. She assigned 2 trustees, one of whom was the famous landscape architect, Arthur Shurleff, to decide how her wishes for Cedar Hill would be carried out.

== Early life ==
Cornelia Lyman Warren was born on March 21, 1857, at her family's estate, Cedar Hill in Waltham, Middlesex County, Massachusetts to Susan Cornelia (née Clarke) and Samuel Dennis Warren. Her father was a businessman and the founder the Cumberland Paper Mills in Westbrook, Maine, who amassed a fortune and established a trust fund to support his five children: Samuel II (1852–1910), who would become a businessman and lawyer; Henry (1854–1899), who was later a noted linguistic scholar; Ned (1860–1928), who grew up to be a collector of art and antiquities; and Fiske (1862–1938), who would later espouse utopist politics. Warren's mother was the daughter of Dorus Clarke, a Congregationalist minister and she, "a powerful and dominant personality", was the parent who was most often present in the children's lives.

Warren was influenced by her father's charity toward his millworkers, having built family housing units with water and electricity for them, at a time when millworkers typically were required to live in basic dormitories provided by their employers. After 1863, when the family purchased property on Boston's Beacon Hill, the Cedar Hill estate became a summer home. As a confirmation that the family had attained the pinnacle of Boston society, they had portraits painted in 1871 by Alexandre Cabanel. Attending private schools and supplementing her education with trips to Europe to study music and language, Warren graduated in 1873. Passing the entrance examinations given by Harvard University, and given that Harvard did not yet accept women, she elected to be privately tutored by George Herbert Palmer and George Holmes Howison for the next three years, rather than pursue a university degree.

== Career ==
Warren was part of a group of friends which included Emily Greene Balch, Katharine Coman, and Vida Scudder, all of whom had ties to Wellesley College. As was expected of women of her social class, Warren became involved in social betterment schemes, such as the Fatherless and Widow's Society, for which she served as trustee beginning in 1879; the Boston Home for Incurables, of which she became a trustee in 1884; as well as providing funds for educational facilities like the Bradford Academy in Haverhill, Massachusetts, the International Institute for Girls in San Sebastián, Spain; Robert College in Constantinople; and the Tuskegee Institute of Alabama. After her father died in 1888, her mother inherited the estate. Cornelia took over the management of Cedar Hill at that time, and showed business acumen in the running of the estate, adding a farm, which utilized environmentally friendly agricultural processes and a dairy, which incorporated the era's ideas of sanitary processing. In 1889–90, she and her Wellesley circle founded the College Settlement Association, along with women from other New England colleges. In her management of the family businesses, she drove the plan to establish profit-sharing for the employees at both the mill in 1891 and her farm at Cedar Hill. The plan was devised to increase worker confidence as well as their earnings.

Having written poetry since childhood, in 1892, Warren published a novel, Miss Wilton, extolling the virtues of both Americanism and Christianity, to mixed reviews. That same year, she became the treasurer of the College Settlement Association and would serve in that capacity for the next eight years. 1892 was also the year that the Associations' Denison House opened, which had been paid for with monies supplied by Warren. The settlement house worked to provide links to education and employment for women and men, and included access to a library, nursery, school, and a gymnasium, the latter of which was purchased by Warren. In 1896, though she had long opened the grounds of Cedar Hill for social events, Warren constructed a maze on the property of Arborvitae for the enjoyment of herself and neighbors.

When Helena Dudley, the director of Denison House from 1893 to 1912, retired, Warren built her a house at Cedar Hill. Dudley lived there until Warren's death in 1921.

In 1900, Warren joined the board of trustees for Wellesley College, but increasingly, was responsible for the care of her mother until she died in 1901. Warren inherited Cedar Hill at that point. In 1903, Warren provided funding for a renovation of the Warren Block (between Main and Cumberland Streets in Westbrook, Maine), a building used for social activities in the town. She also equipped the Warren Manual Training School, which provided trade education to both boys and girls, and provided the monies for the community tennis courts and pool. In 1908, she published A Memorial of My Mother. In 1913, after having served thirteen years on the board for Wellesley, she gave up the post, which her brother Fiske described as the happiest work of her life.

In 1921 a statue commissioned by Warren and sculpted by Bashka Paeff was dedicated in Rverfront Park in Westbrook, Maine. It features a boy sitting on a rock with a dog resting below.

== Death and legacy ==
Warren died on June 4, 1921, at Cedar Hill (death certificate). The process to pass on her estate and for her Trustees to fulfill her wishes took two years. The Girl Scouts of Massachusetts were given 75 acres of the main Cedar Hill campus, the Commonwealth of Massachusetts was given 58 acres to be used by the Massachusetts Agricultural College (to establish a larger eastern Field station), almost 12 acres were given to the Harvard School of Landscape Architecture (for students to practice making map contours), and land was given to the city of Waltham for schools, open space and/or parks. Warren also left funds to the Waltham Hospital and the Boston Museum of Fine Arts, among many other educational and cultural organizations. She left a trust to provide for public facilities, recreation and education in Westbrook, Maine, which became known as the Cornelia Warren Community Association. Her 1871 portrait is in the permanent collection of the Davis Museum at Wellesley College.
