= Warren Block (Westbrook, Maine) =

- U.S. National Register of Historic Places
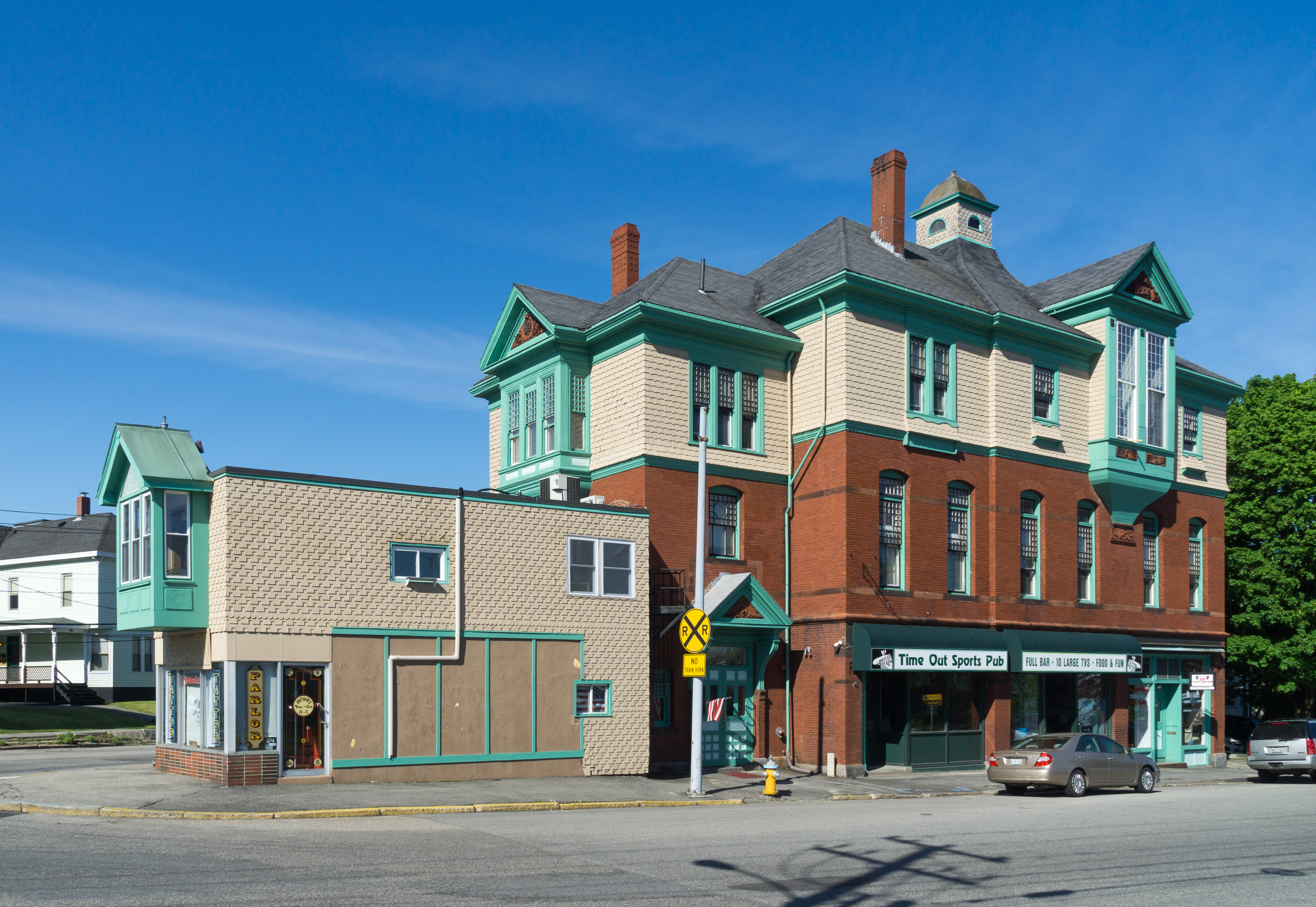
- Warren Block in 2017

- Location within Maine Location within the United States
- Location: Main St., Westbrook, Maine
- Coordinates: 43°40′53″N 70°20′55″W
- Area: 0.5 acres (0.20 ha)
- Built: 1882
- Architect: Fassett & Stevens
- Architectural style: Queen Anne
- NRHP reference No.: 74000315
- Added to NRHP: November 5, 1974

The Warren Block is a historic commercial building at Cumberland and Main Streets in Westbrook, Maine, United States. Built in 1882 to a design by John Calvin Stevens, it is a sophisticated example of commercial Queen Anne architecture. It was listed on the National Register of Historic Places in 1974.

== Description and history ==
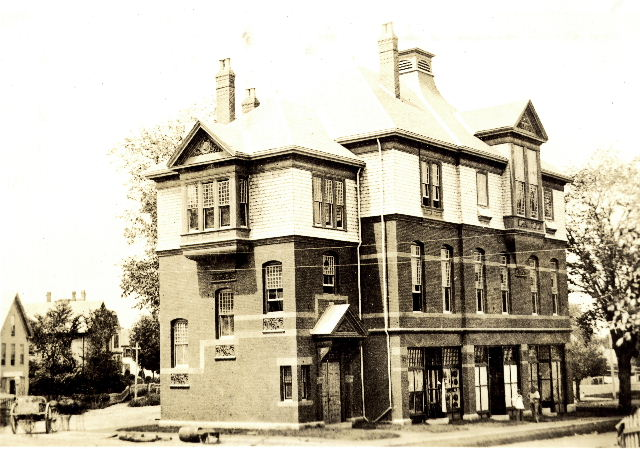
Warren Block ca 1900

The Warren Block stands southeast of the S. D. Warren Paper Mill, at the junction of Main and Cumberland Streets, at that point two one-way streets forming (along with Harnois Avenue) a large island occupied mainly by commercial buildings. The building's front facade faces Cumberland Street, but it also has frontage on Main Street, and is separated from the actual road junction by an attached small modern single-story commercial building. The block is a three-story building, with brick exterior on the lower two floors and a shingled exterior on the third. It is basically rectangular, with a narrower section projecting toward the street corner, and a large polygonal section projecting toward Main Street. The front facade has three storefronts, with recessed entries, although some of these have been modernized. The building entrance to the upper floors is set to their left, with a decorative gabled and bracketed hood sheltering it. Windows on the second floor are set in segmented-arch openings, with multipane upper sashes and transoms.

The block was built in 1882 for Samuel D. Warren, owner of the Warren Paper Mill, as a service to the mill community. Its upper floors housed offices and a large community meeting space, which was used by fraternal organizations such as the International Order of Odd Fellows and the Knights of Pythias. It was designed by John Calvin Stevens, then working in partnership with Francis H. Fassett.

== See also ==
- National Register of Historic Places listings in Cumberland County, Maine
