= John Marshall (died 1928) =

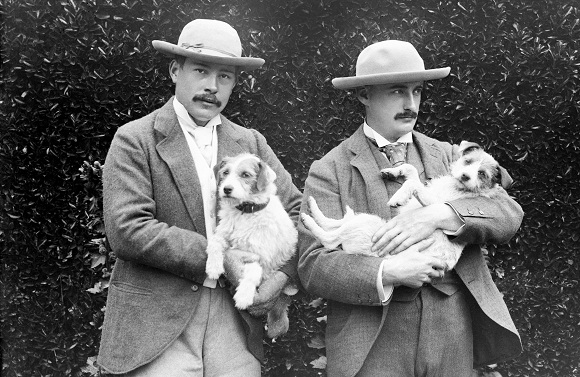
Ned Warren and John Marshall, 1895

John Marshall (1862 - 15 February 1928) was an antiquities art collector, who together with Edward Perry Warren is responsible for enriching the Roman and Greek Art Collection of the Boston Museum of Fine Arts and alone for that of the Metropolitan Museum of Art.

== Biography ==
John Marshall was born in 1862 in Liverpool, England. His father was a wine merchant.

After attending the public school, Marshall enrolled at Liverpool College and studied classic languages, planning to join the priesthood. He was awarded a scholarship to Oxford University where he was top of his class. He was one of the most popular students at the University. At Oxford he met Edward Perry Warren and in 1884 they started a romantic relationship lasting all of their lives. Warren told a friend that he was attracted to Marshall because his lover was "unpretentious and very touching in his affections."

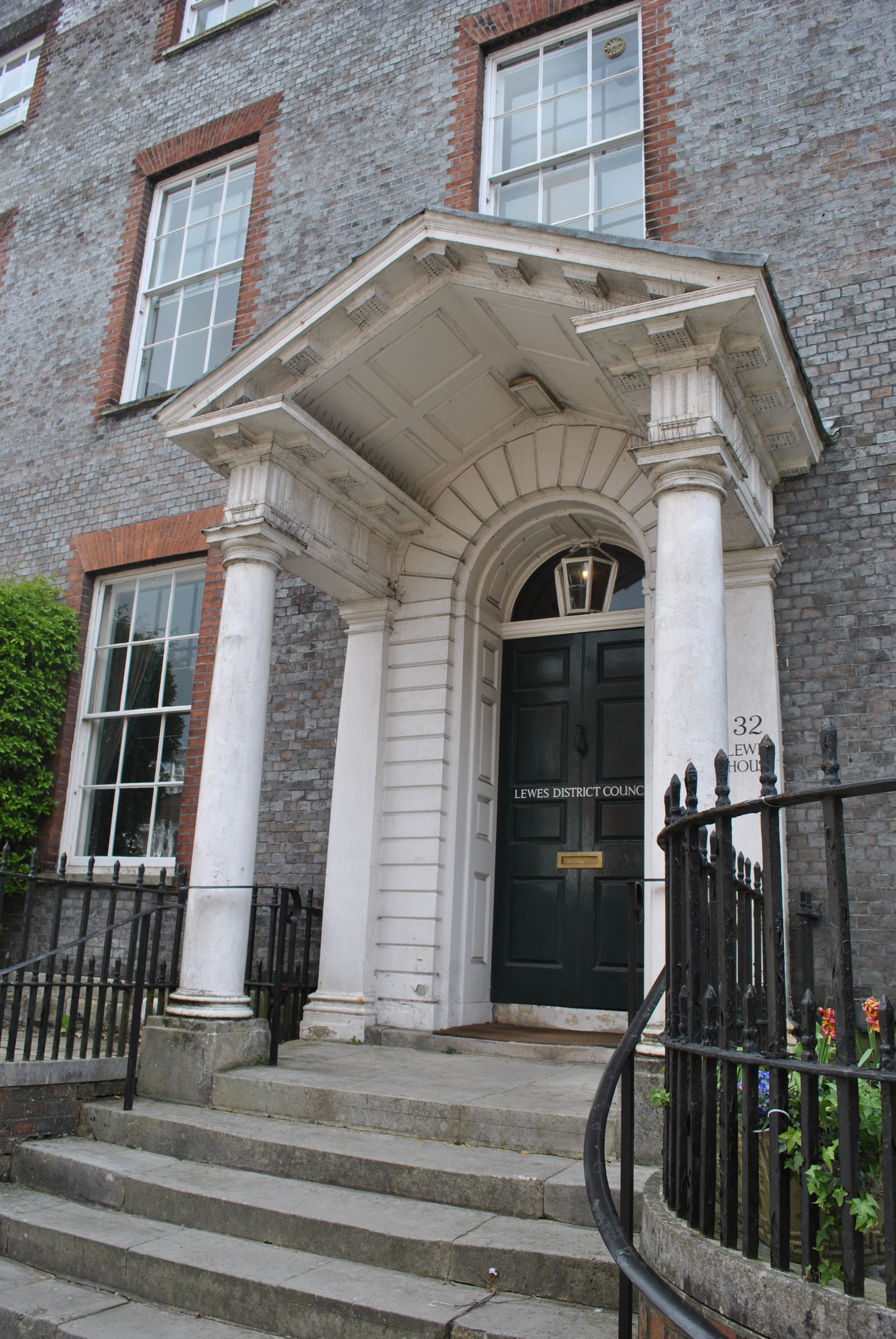
Lewes House in 2017

After college, in 1889, Warren bought the 18th-century Lewes House, in Sussex, and the two moved together there. In 1891 they went to Boston to meet Edward Robinson, the Boston Museum of Fine Arts's curator of antiquities, the intent to discuss the proposal of Warren and Marshall to buy works of art to resell to the Museum with a 20% of gain. Initially Robinson rejected the proposal, and it was Marshall that was able to find a compromise. The first piece they bought for the museum was a large drinking cup from the 6th-century B.C. signed by Euphronios, "the Michelangelo" of terracotta painting. They bought it in Paris in 1892 at the estate sale of the Van Branteghem family. Next they bought several ancient bronze statues and terracotta vases from Count Michal Tyszkiewicz. It appears that in their partnership, Warren had the taste and eye to recognize a good piece, but Marshall was able to determine its origin and age. By 1902 the Boston Museum of Fine Arts' collection was complete and 90% of the pieces had been bought by Warren and Marshall.

By 1894 Warren and Marshall were so involved in the late 19th-century antiquities market that they set up a second home in Rome to be near where those affairs took place. In 10 years they were the most widely respected antiquities collectors, even if Warren took most of the recognition in consideration of his family wealth and connections.

Beginning in the 1900s, Warren was forced to spend long periods in the United States due to family matters and Marshall started to complain about the separation: "I am sick of being alone and, Puppy dear, it is bad for me [...] I would sooner do anything than live alone." Since 1901 Mary Bliss, Warren's unmarried cousin, was living in Lewes House, and Marshall and she started a platonic relationship. In 1903 Marshall visited the Metropolitan Museum of Art and finding their Greek and Roman collection lacking, he convinced museum curator, Edward Robinson, who had moved from Boston to New York, to let him act as buyer for them. Robinson hired Marshall as the Museum's purchasing agent in Rome, and the same year, Gisela Richter began her long career at the Metropolitan. Bliss offered to help Marshall in this new task, substituting Warren in the role he had in the previous business venture for the Boston Museum of Fine Arts. By 1907 she was irreplaceable and she gave Marshall an ultimatum: she would continue to work with him only if they married. Marshall agreed on the only condition of their being a white marriage. Warren supported them and by 1910 he was back in England and they were all living together at Lewes House.

Marshall was so successful in his business that he was able to donate a piece to the Met in his own name, a sandaled ivory foot carved during the Roman Empire dated between 31 B.C. and 14 A.D. John Davidson Beazley said, "Warren and Marshall had complete control of the market in classical antiquities. Almost everything that was good, whether a new find or an old, came to them for first refusal. Competition all but ceased." Another scholar said that "the combined works the two men were responsible for bringing to Boston and New York represent the greatest collection of Greek and Roman art in the world." More than 80% of the antiquities bought by Marshall for the Metropolitan Museum of Art are still on display. Marshall bought three terra cotta Etruscan warriors for the Met and the museum opened a new gallery of Etruscan art, "the first time in an American museum that an entire gallery had been devoted exclusively to Etruscan and Italian antiquities." The gallery opened in 1933, 5 years after Marshall died, and in 1961 it was found that the three warriors were a forgery and they were removed from display.

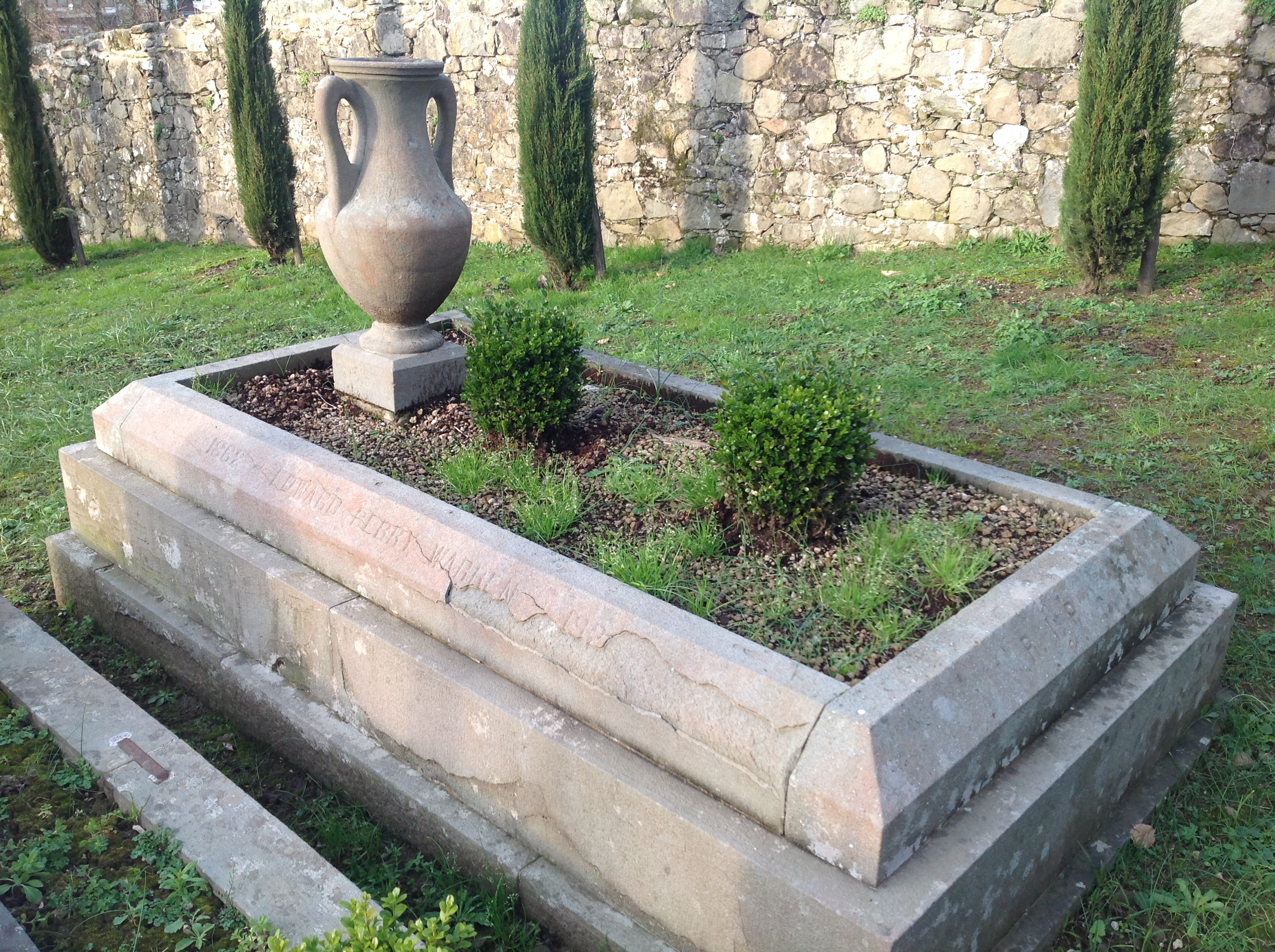
Cimitero Inglese, Bagni di Lucca, Italia

Marshall, Bliss and Warren started spending time in Bagni di Lucca, a spa town in Tuscany, Italy, favored by English tourists. They lived in a 16th-century villa. Bliss died in 1925, Marshall died in February 1928. His parting word to Warren were "Good-bye, Puppy." A friend said that Warren "was ready to die after John’s death [...] quietly putting his house in order before departure." He died in December 1928. The three of them had decided to be buried together in Bagni di Lucca, in the same tomb, with a Grecian urn atop to symbolize their life's work. The Met did not replace Marshall in Rome and Richter took upon the task to buy works of ancient art until her retirement.

According to Green, of all the men who gravitated around Warren, the most important was John Marshall. John Fothergill, Warren's friend and biographer, reports that Warren composed the following epigraph: "Here lies Edward Perry Warren, friend to John Marshall... the finest judge of Greek and Roman antiquities..." reporting Marshall's death date but not his own. J. D. Beazley said that "Warren always spoke of Marshall (over generously) as in a class much superior to himself as an archaeologist." According to Green "The relationship was intellectually and emotionally unequal. But there was some reciprocity, as well as this one-sided adoration. Each called the other Puppy, and in their later years, according to Burdett and Goddard, they came to resemble each other, looking like twin Punchinellos walking arm in arm together."

== Legacy ==
Today the John Marshall Archive Research Project (JMARP), co-sponsored by the British Academy (BASIS Strategic Development Programme) and Christian Levett, promotes the role of John Marshall as principal ancient art purveyor of the 20th century.

A photograph of Warren and Marshall together was used as the cover image of the 2012 nonfiction book Outlaw Marriages: The Hidden Histories of Fifteen Extraordinary Same-Sex Couples by Rodger Streitmatter in which they are they the focus of one chapter.
