= Edward Perry Warren =

American art collector (1860–1928)

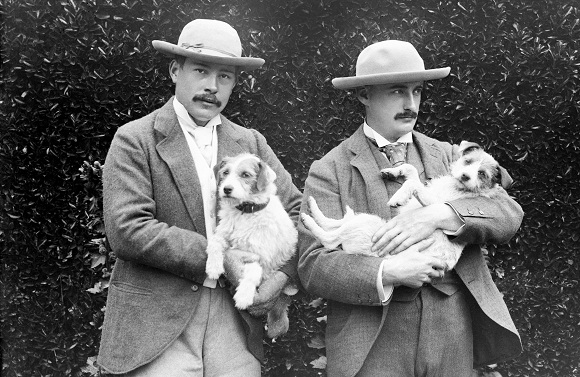
- Edward Perry Warren and John Marshall, 1895
- Born: January 8, 1860; Waltham, Massachusetts, United States
- Died: December 28, 1928 (aged 68); London, England
- Education: Harvard College; New College, Oxford
- Occupation: Author
- Parents: Samuel D. Warren (father); Susan Cornelia Clarke (mother)
- Relatives: Samuel Dennis Warren II (brother); Henry Clarke Warren (brother); Fredrick Fiske Warren (brother); Cornelia Lyman Warren (sister)

Edward Perry Warren (January 8, 1860 – December 28, 1928) was an American millionaire, art collector and the author of works proposing an idealized view of homosexual relationships. He is now best known as the former owner of the Warren Cup in the British Museum.

== Biography ==
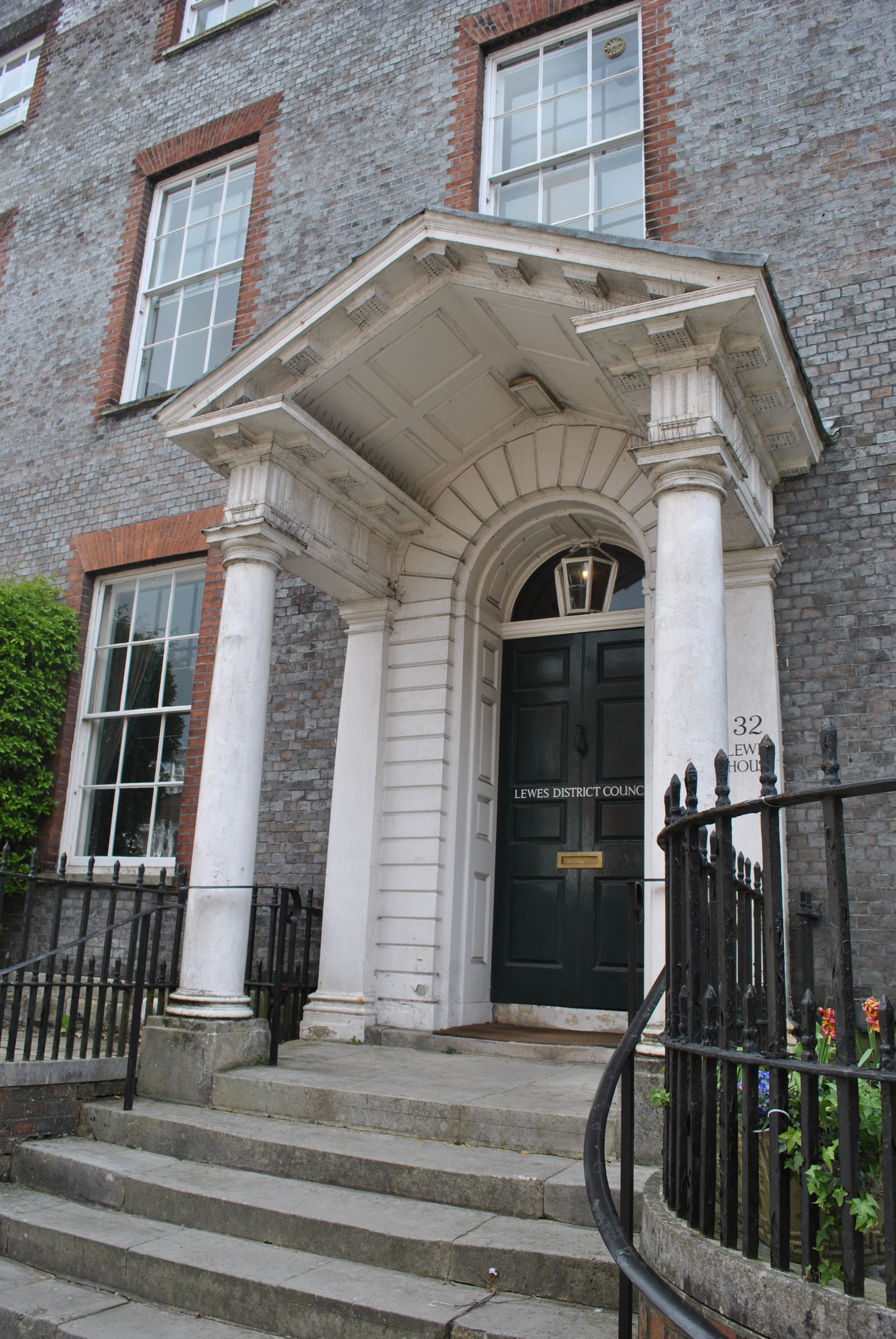
Lewes House, 2017

Warren was born on January 8, 1860, in Waltham, Massachusetts, one of five children born into a wealthy Boston, Massachusetts, family. He was the son of Samuel D. Warren (1817–1888), who founded the Cumberland Paper Mills in Maine, and Susan Cornelia Clarke (1825–1901), the daughter of Dorus Clarke. He had four siblings: Samuel Dennis Warren II (1852–1910), lawyer and businessman; Henry Clarke Warren (1854–1899), scholar of Sanskrit and Pali; Cornelia Lyman Warren (1857–1921), philanthropist; Fredrick Fiske Warren (1862–1938), political radical and utopist.

Ned Warren received his B.A. from Harvard College in 1883 and later studied at New College, Oxford, earning his MPhil in Classics. His academic interest was classical archeology. At Oxford he met archeologist John Marshall (1862–1928), with whom he formed a close and long-lasting relationship, though Marshall married in 1907, much to Warren's dismay. Beginning in 1888, Warren made England his primary home. He and Marshall lived together at Lewes House, a large residence in Lewes, East Sussex, where they became the center of a circle of like-minded men interested in art and antiquities who ate together in a dining room overlooked by Lucas Cranach's Adam and Eve—a gift of Harold W. Parsons—now in the Courtauld Institute of Art. One account said that "Warren's attempts to produce a supposedly Greek and virile way of living into his Sussex home" resulted in "a comic mixture of apparently monastic severity (no tea or soft chairs allowed) and lavish living."

Warren spent much of his time in Continental Europe collecting art works, many of which he donated to the Museum of Fine Arts, Boston, assembling for that institution the "largest collection of erotic Greek vase paintings" in the U.S. He has been described as having "a taste for pornography" and was a "pioneer" in collecting it. His published works include A Defence of Uranian Love in three volumes, which proposes a type of same-sex relationship similar to that prevalent in Classical Greece, in which an older man would act as guide and lover to a younger man.

In 1900 Warren published The Prince who did not Exist, a small edition art book from the Merrymount Press, "a most beautiful specimen of workmanship" according to The New York Times.

Warren's oldest brother, Samuel D. Warren II, had left law to work in managing the family's paper mills. He managed the family trust established in May 1889 with the legal assistance of Louis D. Brandeis to benefit his father's widow and five children. Edward Warren challenged the family trust in 1906, claiming that Brandeis had structured it to benefit his law partner Samuel to the detriment of the other family members. The dispute ended with Samuel's suicide in 1910. The Warren Trust case became a point of contention during the 1916 Senate hearings on the confirmation of Brandeis to the Supreme Court, and it remains important for its explication of legal ethics and professional responsibility.

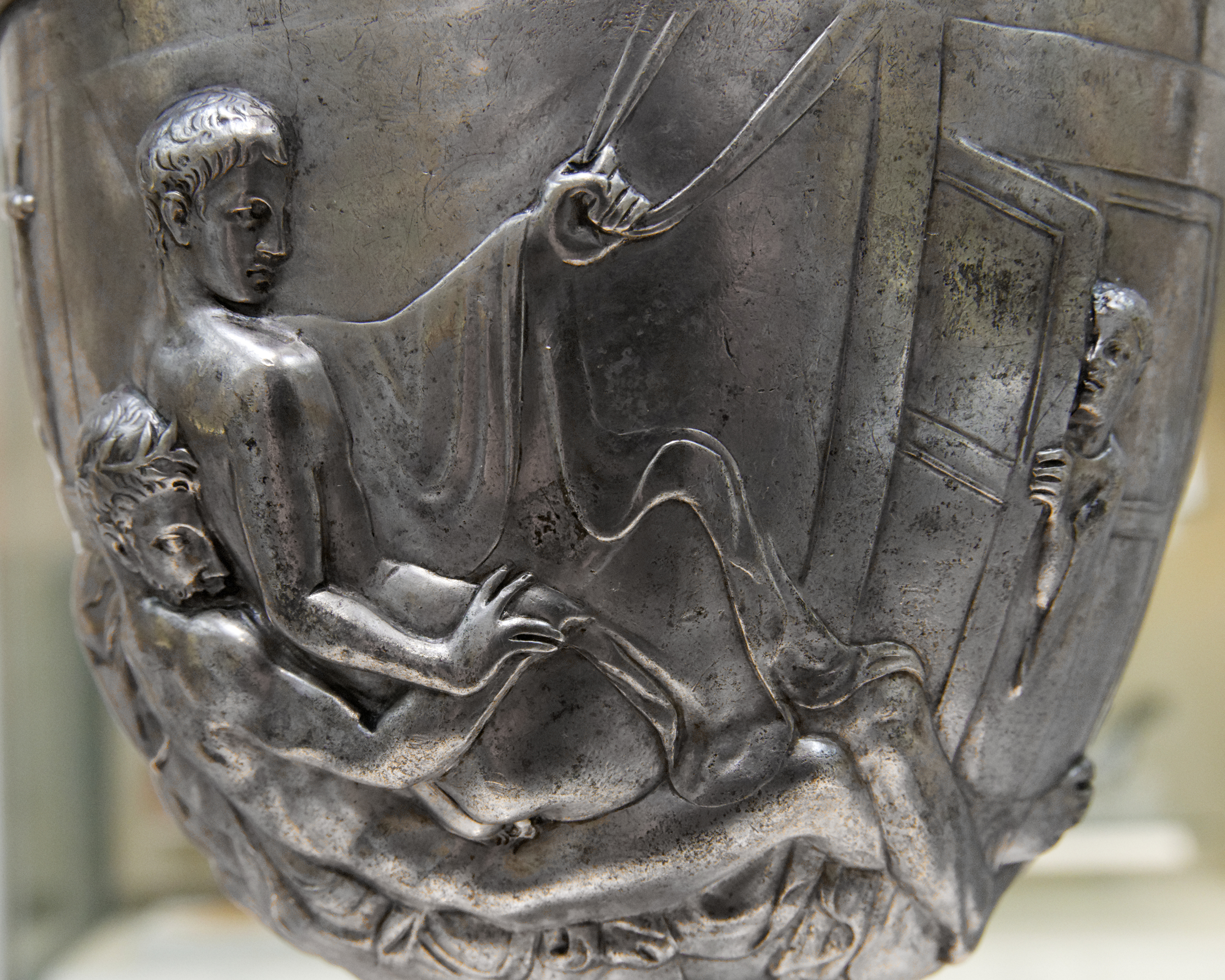
Warren Cup: a bearded man having anal sex with a beardless youth

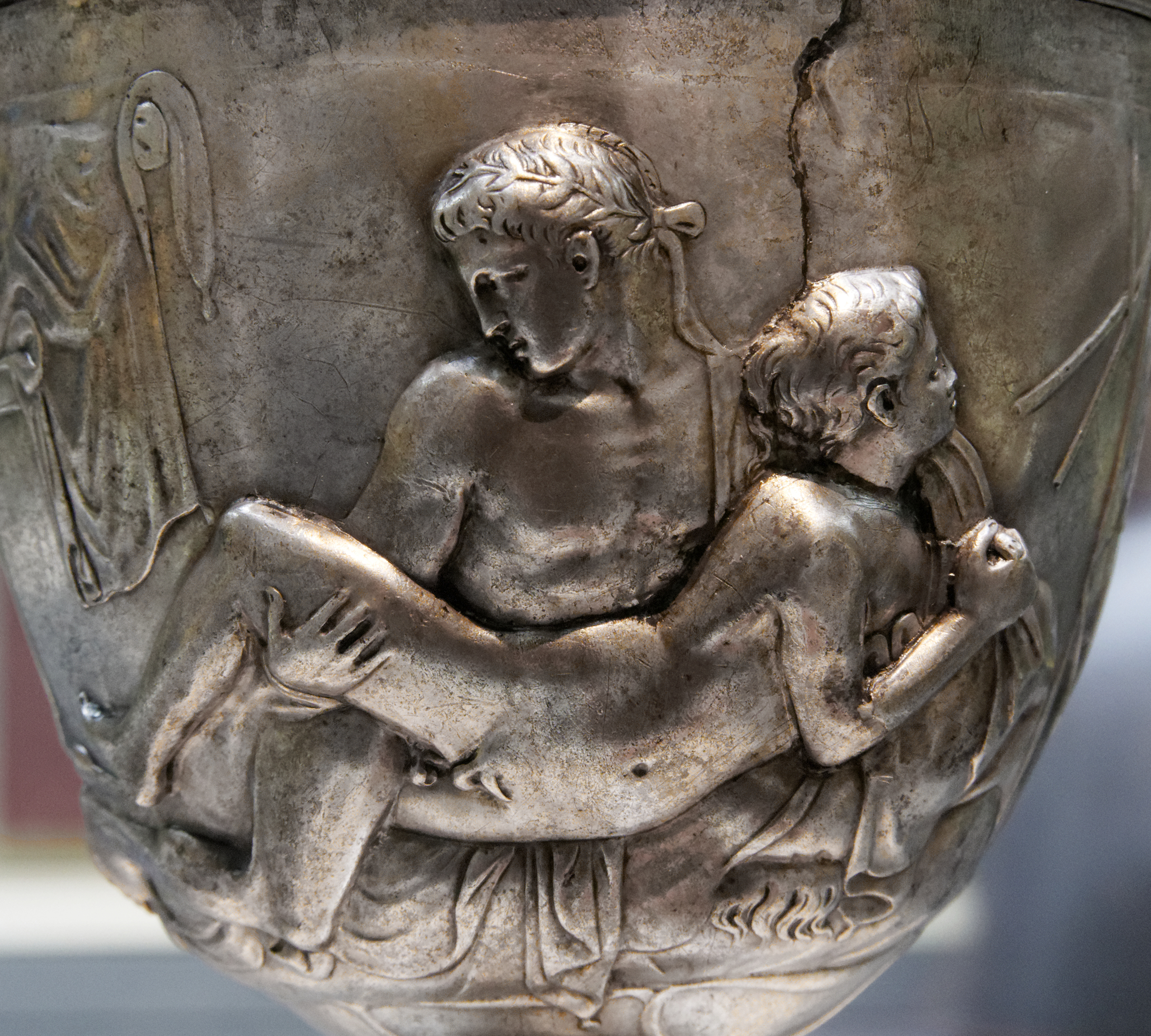
Warren Cup: a beardless man having anal sex with a young boy

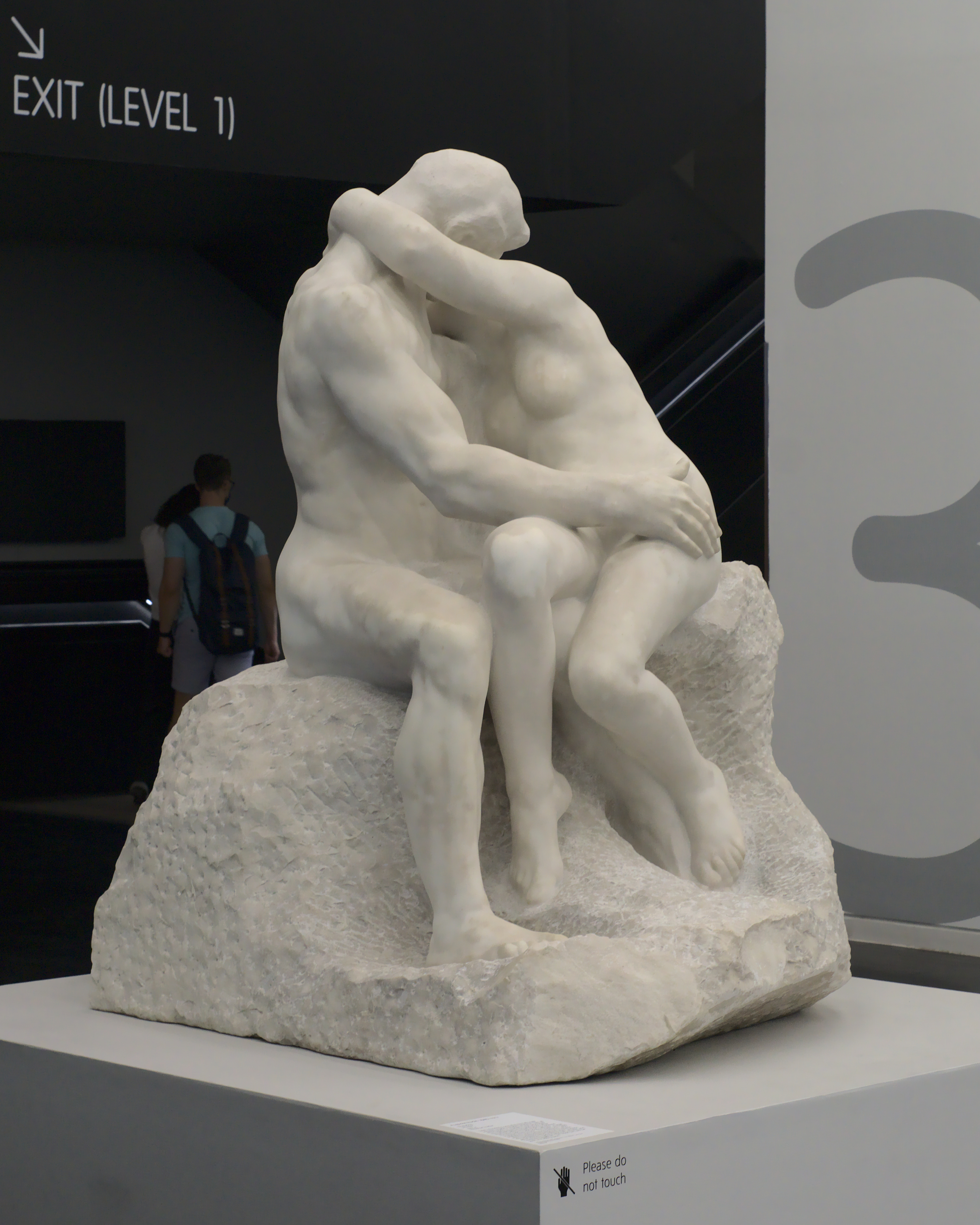
Auguste Rodin's sculpture Le Baiser ("The Kiss")

Warren purchased the ancient Greco-Roman drinking vessel known as the Warren Cup, now in the British Museum, which he did not attempt to sell during his lifetime because of its explicit depiction of homoerotic scenes.

Warren's notable friend and a frequent visitor in Lewes was the French sculptor Auguste Rodin. Warren commissioned a larger than life-size version of Le Baiser ("The Kiss") from Rodin "in the finest possible marble" for his own private collection. Rodin had already sculpted such a group which he called La Foi ("The Truth"). Warren was very much taken with this study and commissioned Rodin to execute a further example, but to be completed to his particular specification, which differed in several respects from La Foi and a third example which Rodin had undertaken. The contract drawn up, specified Rodin's fee of 20,000 francs, as well as the stipulation that “the genital organ of the man must be completed”. Warren offered it as a gift to the local council in Lewes. The council displayed it for two years before returning it as unsuitable for public display. Warren's Kiss study, generally regarded today as being the finest of the three examples, is now a national treasure and displayed in the Tate Gallery in London.

In 1911 Warren adopted a four-year-old boy, Travis. The child grew up at Lewes House and Fewacres, calling Warren "Papa". He was the illegitimate son of the daughter of a Cornish vicar and a local squire. Warren told Lois Shaw, a relative and friend, "I think that I have found a boy to adopt, but shall not know till my return to England. He is of good birth and healthy. I am a little afraid of him, because he seems likely to be of some account and therefore troublesome." Warren later said, "If it is to be this boy, this handful, he must have a man about, to take after. I won't do: I know that. Harry [H. Asa Thomas, Warren's secretary] would. He admires Harry, but Harry hates his tantrums. Harry, you see, is not keen on children. Neither am I." Travis Warren attended Winchester College. He was not a good student, and he changed schools, going to Tonbridge School.

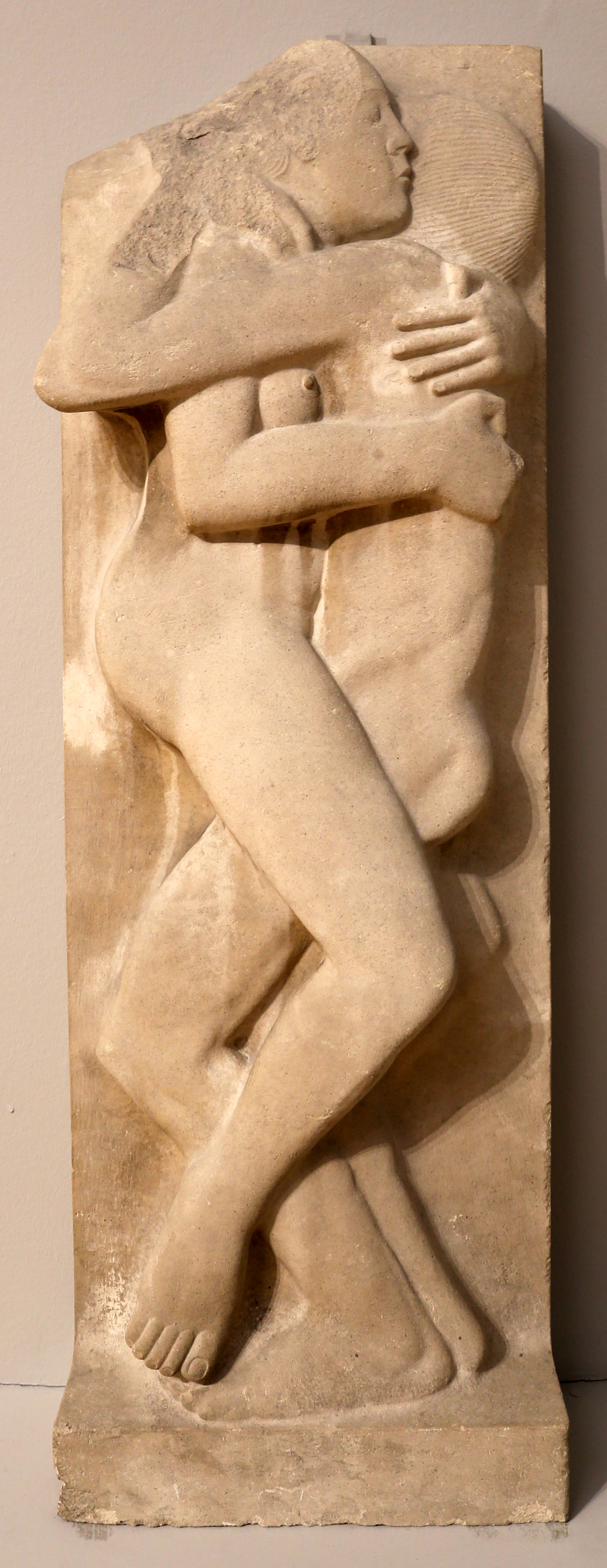
Ecstasy

In 1912 Warren acquired a relief sculpture by Eric Gill depicting a male figure and a female figure, standing in the act of copulating. After Warren's death in 1928 and Gill's death in 1940, the sculpture was sold at Sotheby's in March 1949 by Warren's heir H. Asa Thomas. The work was called They by Gill; it only became known as Ecstasy from the Sotheby's sale in 1949. It was bought by the Tate Gallery in 1982.

Warren had a home, Fewacres, in Westbrook, Maine, near the paper mills of his father. Marshall had a home in Rome. After the death of Mary Bliss Marshall in 1925, Marshall spent more time ever at Lewes House, where he died in 1928. John Marshall's will named Warren as his executor and beneficiary. Later that year, Warren became seriously ill and underwent surgery. He died in a London nursing home on December 28, 1928. His ashes were buried in the non-Catholic cemetery in Bagni di Lucca, Italy, a town that is known as a spa in Etruscan and Roman times. In the same tomb are buried John Marshall and the latter's wife, Mary.

According to Green, of all the men who gravitated around Warren, the most important was John Marshall. John Fothergill, Warren's friend and biographer, reports that Warren composed the following epigraph: "Here lies Edward Perry Warren, friend to John Marshall ... the finest judge of Greek and Roman antiquities." He reported Marshall's death date but not his own. J. D. Beazley said that "Warren always spoke of Marshall (over generously) as in a class much superior to himself as an archaeologist." According to Green, "the relationship was intellectually and emotionally unequal. But there was some reciprocity, as well as this one-sided adoration. Each called the other Puppy, and in their later years, according to Burdett and Goddard, they came to resemble each other, looking like twin Punchinellos walking arm in arm together."

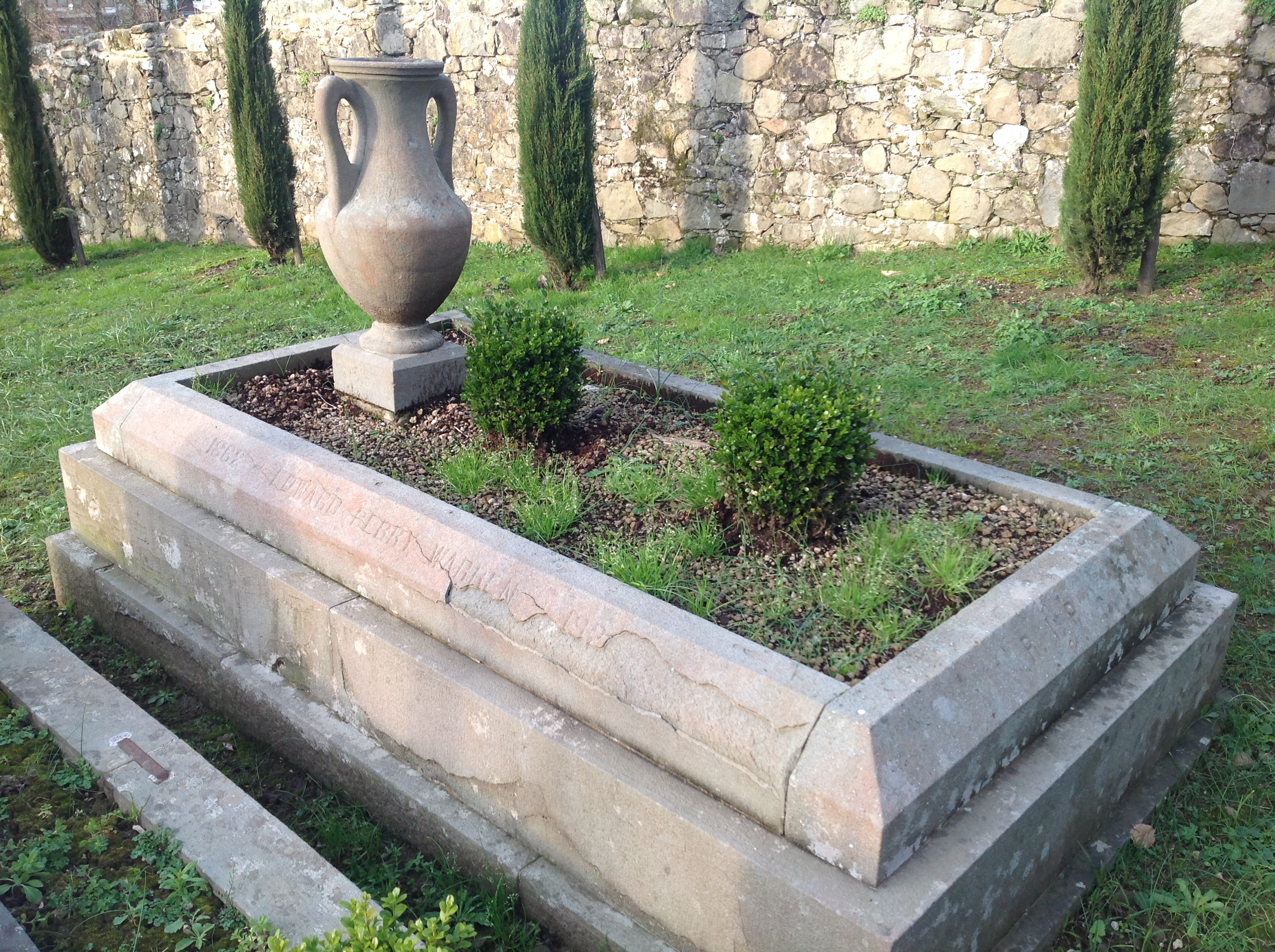
Cimitero Inglese (English Cemetery), Bagni di Lucca, Italy

In March 1928, Warren had already given Lewes House and its adjoining properties to H. Asa Thomas, who had begun as his secretary and become his business associate and friend; meanwhile, Fewacres and its adjoining properties went to Charles Murray West, his other secretary. Both Thomas and West sold the properties a few years after Warren's death. Travis Warren inherited $3,000 a year managed by his guardians (Thomas and Burdett) up to the age of twenty-eight. From 28 to 32 years old he was to receive $20,000, and $200 a month, and his guardians could invest up to $30,000 on his behalf in a business. At the end of the trust, he was to receive $3,000 a year. Despite all this money, Travis was poor by the end of his life.

In 1935 a collection of Greek papyrus texts has been donated to Leiden University in The Netherlands, prompting the foundation of the Leids Papyrologisch Instituut.

The disposition of Warren's estate was complicated by legal problems. An auction of some 250 pieces of his furniture brought $38,885. The Sackler Library at Oxford University holds the "Papers of E.P. Warren and John Marshall." Warren's will established the position of EP Warren Praelector at Corpus Christi College, Oxford, and established restrictions, no longer maintained, that ensured the holder lived at or near the college and taught only men.

A photograph of Warren and Marshall together was used as the cover image of the 2012 nonfiction book Outlaw Marriages: The Hidden Histories of Fifteen Extraordinary Same-Sex Couples by Rodger Streitmatter in which they are the focus of one chapter.

In 2013, the Boston Museum of Fine Arts determined that the ancient Roman bronze statuette of a nude young man dubbed "Antinoüs" it purchased from Warren in 1904 had been stolen from a French museum in 1901 and arranged for its return.

== Select works ==
- The Prince Who Did Not Exist (1900)
- The Wild Rose: A Volume of Poems (London and New York, David Nutt, enlarged edition 1913, original copyright 1909) published under the pseudonym Arthur Lyon Raile.
- Classical and American Education (Oxford, B.H. Blackwell, 1918)
- Alcmaeon, Hypermestra, Caeneus (Oxford: B.H. Blackwell, 1919)
- A Tale of Pausanian Love (1927), under the pseudonym Arthur Lyon Raile
- A Defence of Uranian Love, 3 vols. (privately printed, 1928–30), under the pseudonym Arthur Lyon Raile

== Works reissued ==
- The Collected Works and Commissioned Biography of Edward Perry Warren, in 2 vols., edited with an introduction and notes by Michael Matthew Kaylor (Brno, CZ: Masaryk University Press, 2013). ISBN 978-80-210-6345-7
- A Defence of Uranian Love, edited with an introduction and notes by Michael Matthew Kaylor (Kansas City, MO: Valancourt Books, 2009)

== See also ==
- Isabella Stewart Gardner
- Uranian poets

== Sources ==
- Osbert Burdett, E.H. Goddard (Edward Henry Goddard), Edward Perry Warren: The Biography of a Connoisseur (London: Christophers, 1941)
- Martin Burgess Green, The Mount Vernon Street Warrens: A Boston Story, 1860-1910 (NY: Charles Scribner's Sons, 1989)
- Matthew Kaylor, Secreted Desires: The Major Uranians: Hopkins, Pater and Wilde (Brno, CZ: Masaryk University Press, 2006)
- John Potvin, "Askesis as Aesthetic Home: Edward Perry Warren, Lewes House, and the Ideal of Greek Love," Home Cultures, vol. 8, number 1 (March 2011), 71–89
- David Sox, "Warren, Edward Perry (1860–1928)", Oxford Dictionary of National Biography (Oxford University Press, 2004); online edition, May 2005, accessed 5 June 2006
- David Sox, Bachelors of Art: Edward Perry Warren & the Lewes House Brotherhood, (Fourth Estate, 1991)
- Dyfri Williams, The Warren Cup. British Museum Objects in Focus series. British Museum Press, 2006. ISBN 978-0-7141-2260-1
- K.A. Worp, "P.Warren (=Pap.Lug.Bat. 1)", Bulletin of the American Society of Papyrologists, 47 (2010), 238–40, a short article identifying this Warren with the "E.P. Warren" behind the volume of papyri bearing his name.
- Rodger Streitmatter, Outlaw Marriages: The Hidden Histories of Fifteen Extraordinary Same-Sex Couples (Beacon Press, 2012)
