= Henry Clarke Warren =

American scholar

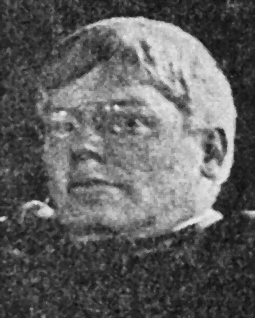
- Born: November 18, 1854; Boston, Massachusetts, U.S.
- Died: January 3, 1899 (aged 44); Cambridge, Massachusetts, U.S.
- Education: Harvard University
- Known for: Scholar of Sanskrit and Pali
- Notable work: Harvard Oriental Series (co-founder)
- Father: Samuel Denis Warren
- Relatives: Cornelia Lyman Warren (sister); Samuel D. Warren II (brother); Edward Perry Warren (brother); Fredrick Fiske Warren (brother)

Henry Clarke Warren (November 18, 1854 – January 3, 1899) was an American scholar of Sanskrit and Pali. He was a co-founder of the Harvard Oriental Series.

== Biography ==
Born in Boston, Warren was a son of Susan Cornelia Clarke (1825–1901) and Samuel Denis Warren (1817–1888), a wealthy paper manufacturer in Boston. He had four adult siblings: (Note: Another sibling, Josiah Fiske Warren, died in infancy.) Samuel D. Warren II (1852–1910), businessperson; Cornelia Lyman Warren (1857–1921), philanthropist; Edward Perry Warren (1860–1928), art collector; and Fredrick Fiske Warren (1862–1938), political radical and utopist.

A fall as a young boy caused a spine injury which left Warren impaired for the rest of his life. He graduated in 1879 with an A.B. from Harvard University, and followed it up with studies at Johns Hopkins University under Charles Rockwell Lanman and Maurice Bloomfield, and at Oxford University with T. W. Rhys Davids.

Warren, along with Lanman, founded the Harvard Oriental Series in 1891. The same year, he purchased the house of Charles Beck in Cambridge, Massachusetts, and lived in it until his death. Warren died in the home on January 3, 1899. Upon his death, he left $15,000 ($580,500 in 2025) towards publication of the Harvard Oriental Series. His house, along with the bulk of his estate, was bequeathed to Harvard University; the building is now listed on the National Register of Historic Places as the Beck-Warren House.

Warren's work Buddhism in Translation (1896) and translation (along with Dharmananda Damodar Kosambi) of the Visuddhimagga of Buddhaghosa (1950) appeared as Volume 3 and Volume 41 of the Harvard Oriental Series, respectively.

== Sources ==
- Obituary: Lanman, C. R.; Henry Clarke Warren (1854-1899): A Brief Memorial; Buddhist Annual of Ceylon, Vol I (1920), No. 2, p. 28-32
