= Beck-Warren House =

Historic house in Massachusetts, United States

- U.S. National Register of Historic Places
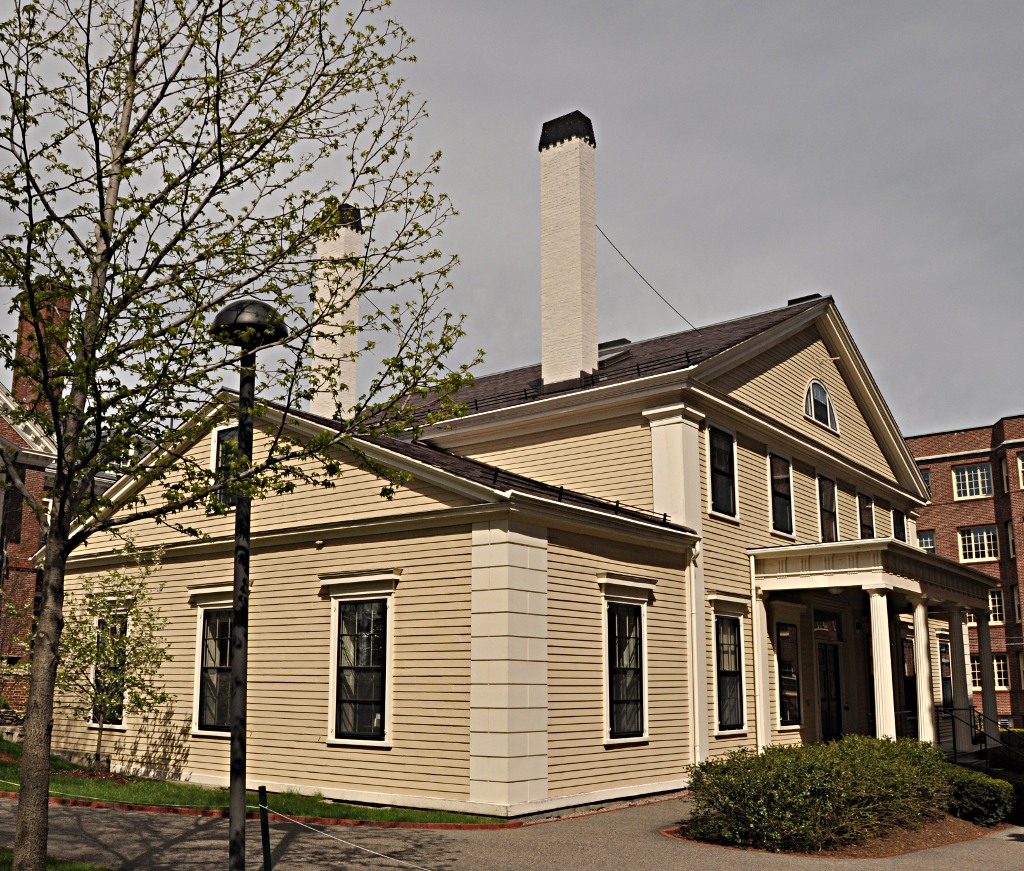

- Location within Massachusetts Location within the United States
- Location: 11 Prescott St., Cambridge, Massachusetts
- Coordinates: 42°22′22.6″N 71°06′51.2″W
- Area: less than one acre
- Built: 1833
- Architectural style: Colonial Revival, Greek Revival
- MPS: Cambridge MRA
- NRHP reference No.: 96000520
- Added to NRHP: May 20, 1996

The Beck-Warren House, also known as the Warren House, is a historic house located in Cambridge, Massachusetts. Now on the campus of Harvard University, this large Greek Revival wood-frame house was built in 1833 for Professor Charles Beck, and was later purchased and adapted by the physically disabled Henry Clarke Warren, a Sanskrit scholar. Since 1899, it has belonged to Harvard University, for whom it presently houses offices. The house was listed on the National Register of Historic Places in 1996.

== Description and history ==
The Warren House stands in the eastern part of the Harvard campus, on the west side of Prescott Street, as part of an entire city block just east of Harvard Yard of Harvard University-owned buildings. It has a 2 1/2-story main block, which is covered by a front-facing gable roof, with single-story side-gabled wings extending to the sides that are flush with the front façade. he main façade faces west, into a pedestrian area providing access to the other Harvard buildings on the block. The main block's corners are pilastered, while those of the wings have wooden quoining. The gable is fully pedimented, with a half-round window at the center. A single-story porch extends across the central three bays, its flat roof and entablature supported by smooth Doric columns. The interior features a distinctive blend of Greek Revival and Colonial Revival features, the latter done during the ownership of Henry Warren, handicapped by a spinal deformity from childhood. The second-floor alterations were particularly made to adapt to his needs.

The house was built in 1833 by Charles Beck, a Professor of Latin at Harvard. It was built on land that was previously part of the large estate of Francis Dana and subdivided by his heirs. It was acquired in 1891 by Henry Clarke Warren, serving as his home until his death in 1899. Warren made numerous alterations to the interior to accommodate his physical disability, including an overly sized heating system which he was said to run up to 90 degrees Fahrenheit.

When Henry Clarke Warren died in 1899 he bequeathed the house to Harvard. When first acquired, it was used to house the philosophy library, and then the English department. It was moved in 1900 (within its historic lot) to make room for the construction of the Harvard Union to the south. Since 1997, it has served as offices for other Harvard organizations.

== See also ==
- National Register of Historic Places listings in Cambridge, Massachusetts
