= Jacob Abbott House =

Historic house in Maine, United States

- Formerly listed on the U.S. National Register of Historic Places
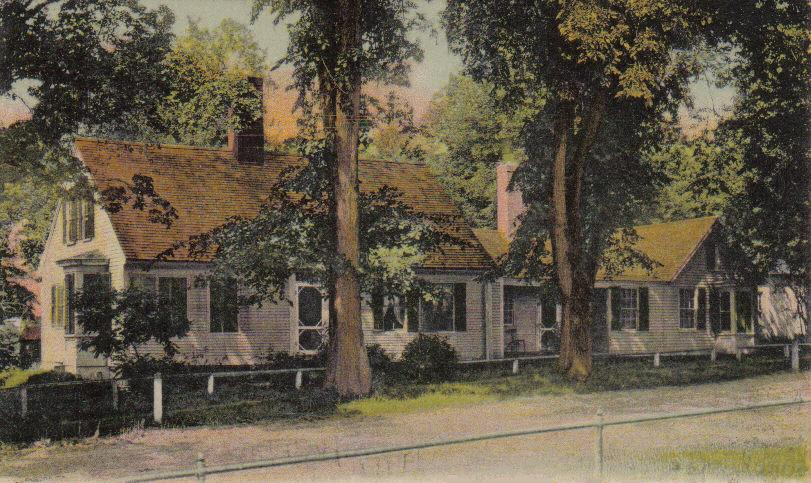
- "Few Acres" from a 1906 postcard.
- Nearest city: Farmington, Maine
- Built: 1819
- NRHP reference No.: 73000103

Significant dates
- Added to NRHP: November 26, 1973
- Removed from NRHP: April 27, 2010

Jacob Abbott House also known as Fewacres was a historic house in Farmington, Maine. It was built in 1819 and added to the National Register of Historic Places in 1983. It was the home of Jacob Abbott, author of children's books.

Edward Warren, art collector and author, lived here in the early 20th century.
