= Fiske Warren =

American tennis player and Georgist

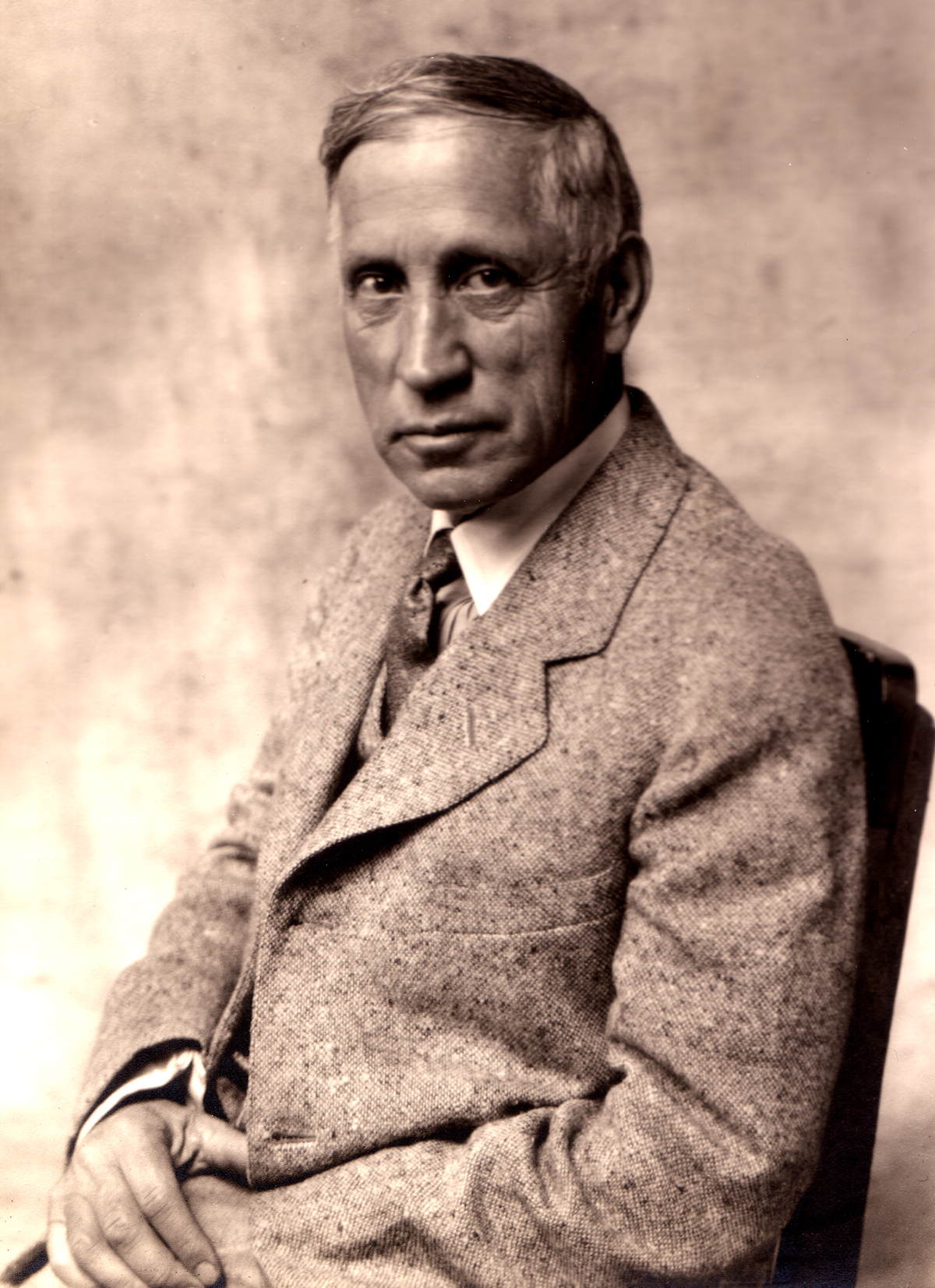
- Fiske Warren of Beacon Hill, Boston
- Born: Frederick Fiske Warren; July 3, 1862; Boston, Massachusetts, United States
- Died: February 2, 1938 (aged 75); Boston, Massachusetts, United States
- Occupation: Businessman
- Spouse: Gretchen Osgood (m. 1891)
- Parents: Samuel Dennis Warren (father); Susan Cornelia Clarke (mother)
- Relatives: Samuel Dennis Warren II (brother); Henry Clarke Warren (brother); Edward Perry Warren (brother); Cornelia Lyman Warren (sister)

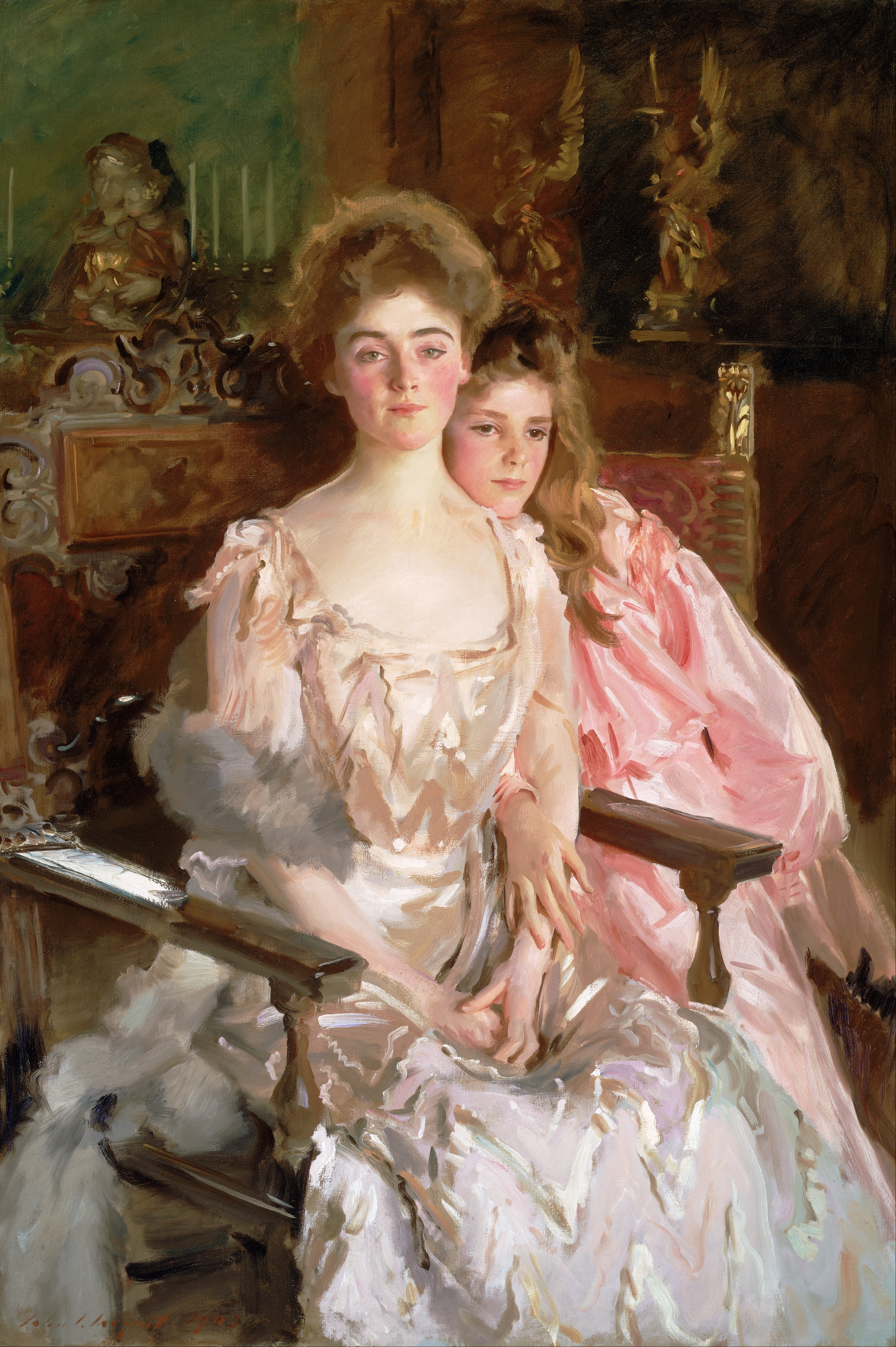
Mrs. Fiske Warren (Gretchen Osgood) and Her Daughter Rachel, 1903, John Singer Sargent (Museum of Fine Arts (Boston))

Frederick Fiske Warren (July 3, 1862 – February 2, 1938) was an American tennis player, businessman, developer, and Georgist reformer. He was a major supporter of Henry George's single tax system and created several experimental single-tax communities. He also worked to secure independence for the Philippines, following the Spanish–American War. Warren was the United States amateur tennis champion of 1891 and 1893.

== Early life ==
Warren was born in Waltham, Massachusetts on July 3, 1862. Known throughout his life simply as Fiske Warren, he was the son of Susan Cornelia (née Clarke) and Samuel Dennis Warren of Beacon Hill, Boston. His father owned the S. D. Warren Paper Co. in Westbrook, Maine and was also a generous patron of the arts. Warren had four siblings: Samuel Dennis Warren II, Henry Clarke Warren, Edward Perry Warren, and Cornelia Lyman Warren.

Warren was raised in a mansion on 67 Mount Vernon Street on Beacon Hill in Boston and "Cedar Hill" in Waltham. As part of a philanthropic and well-educated family, Warren enjoyed a tranquil childhood. When he was young, he had a stutter, but cured himself to become a fluent speaker.

Warren graduated from Harvard College in 1884. While at Harvard, he was a member of Alpha Delta Phi, Delta Kappa Epsilon (aka The Dickey Club), the Hasty Pudding Club, the Institute of 1770. He also played tennis. He then studied law at the University of Oxford.

== Career ==
=== Business ===
After college, Warren worked for the S. D. Warren Paper Co. He became a partner in the firm in 1889, and was eventually the company's largest stockholder. Warren was president of Warren Paper Co. from 1918 to 1924. He belonged to the Boston Paper Trade Association and the Society of the Chemical Industry.

=== Tennis ===
Warren was the United States amateur champion of court tennis in 1891. In 1893 United States amateur champion lawn tennis, winning the Boston Athletic Association and the New York Racquet and Tennis Club competitions. He continued to play tennis competitively until 1898.

=== Anti-imperialism and the Philippines ===
After meeting Sixto Lopez in London in 1899, Warren worked to gain indepdence for the Philippines. Warren returned to Boston and joined the American Anti-Imperialist League, a political organization established by George S. Boutwell, Edward Atkinson, Patrick Collins in response to the Spanish–American War. He served on the organization's executive committee and brough Lopez to Boston in 1900. Because of his efforts on behalf of the Philippines, The Syracuse Herald called Warren "an enthusiast and an idealist...of the Phillips or Garrison type" in January 1908.

Warren was noticeable in his efforts because of his social standing, wealth, and intelligence, making it difficult for then Secretary of State William Howard Taft to ignore him. At the suggestion of Boutwell, Warren resigned from the Anti-Imperialist League in the summer of 1901 when he traveled to the Philippines with Lopez. At the time, newspapers denounced Warren as an "intriguer and renegade American". He returned to Boston in February 1902, but went back to the Philippines to continue his investigations of conditions there in 1904. Warren was also a director of the American Peace Association.

=== Single tax experiments ===
Warren was a major supporter of Henry George's single tax system, which he helped develop in Harvard in the 1930s. Warren traveled around the world five times, promoting the single tax system. Warren said, "I believe taxes should be on land, not on improvements. It is just only to tax people because the community creates land values, and these values should be taxed, for the benefit of the community."

Warren established thirteen Georgist single-tax experimental colonies. Under his scheme, residents paid an annual sum to the community called "economic rent", instead of taxes; there were no other taxes. Warren established Tahanto in Harvard, Massachusetts in 1909. This was follwed by Halidon in Westbrook, Maine in 1911; Sant Jordi in Santa Coloma, Andorra; and Shakerton in Aye, Massachusetts. He also established the experimental community Andorra to disprove Malthus's population theory. At one time, his communities had 9,000 residents and comprised 971 square miles with an annual rental of $428,598.

== Personal life ==
On May 14, 1891, he married Gretchen Osgood, daughter of Dr. Hamilton Osgood and Margaret Cushing (Pearmain) Osgood at Trinity Church in Boston. The Osgoods were a well-known Beacon Hill family that claimed a direct genealogical line to Anne Hutchinson and John Quincy Adams. The couple originally lived in apartments on Chestnut Street in Boston, but moved to a large house at 8 Mount Vernon Place. They had a second home at Tahanto Farm in Harvard, Massachusetts and a seashore house at Mattapoisett, Massachusetts. Gretchen was an acknowledged society leader in Boston. The couple had three children, Rachel, Marjorie, and Hamilton.

Warren drove the first "electric carriage" in Massachusetts in 1891, becoming one of the first people to drive an automobile in the United States. In 1898, he took a world tour with his family, making an extended stay in Japan and California. He made a bicylce tour of Europe in 1933.

Warren was a member of the Boston Athletic Association, the Boston City Club, the Economic Club, the Harvard Club of Boston, the National Arts Club, the Twentieth Century Club, and the Union Club of Boston.

Fiske Warren died from heart disease at Massachusetts General Hospital in Boston on February 2, 1938.
