= Nutter McClennen & Fish =

US law firm in Boston, Massachusetts

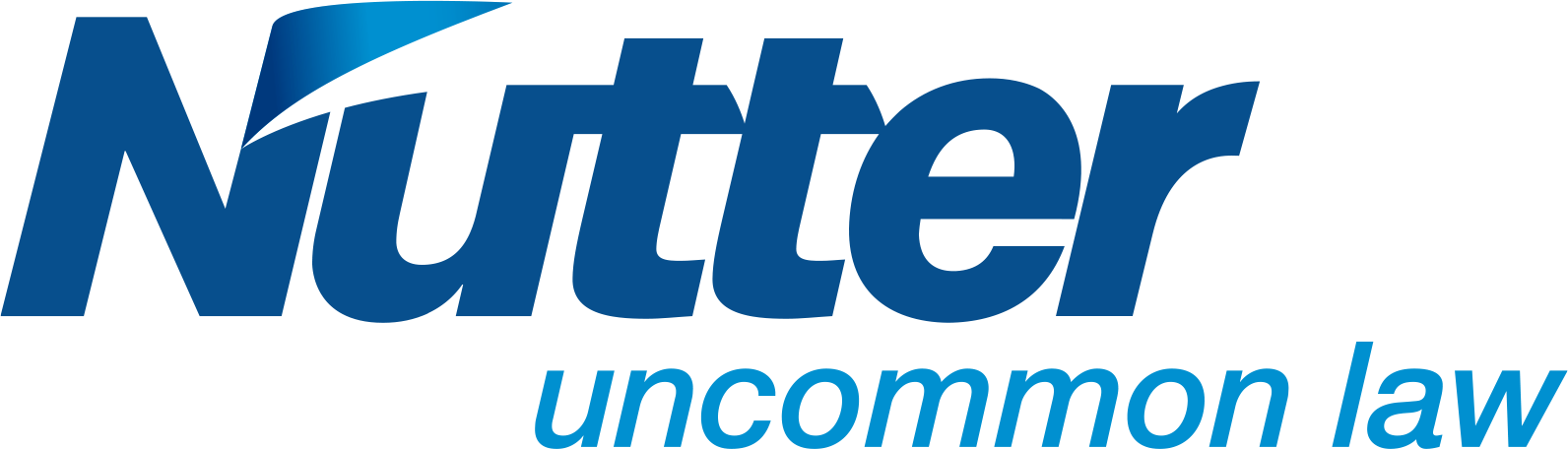
- Headquarters: Boston, Massachusetts
- No. of attorneys: 140
- Major practice areas: General Practice
- Date founded: 1879; 147 years ago
- Founder: Samuel D. Warren II; Louis D. Brandeis
- Company type: Limited liability partnership
- Website: www.nutter.com

Nutter McClennen & Fish LLP is a long-standing law firm based in Boston, Massachusetts. The firm has a wide variety of practice areas including intellectual property, technology, business, litigation, and real estate law. Nutter was co-founded by Samuel D. Warren II and Louis Brandeis. Brandeis practiced at the firm until his appointment to the Supreme Court. Nutter has won several awards and has achieved various notable rankings. It has ranked first for its summer associate program and has received high rankings for midlevel associate satisfaction.

== Early years ==
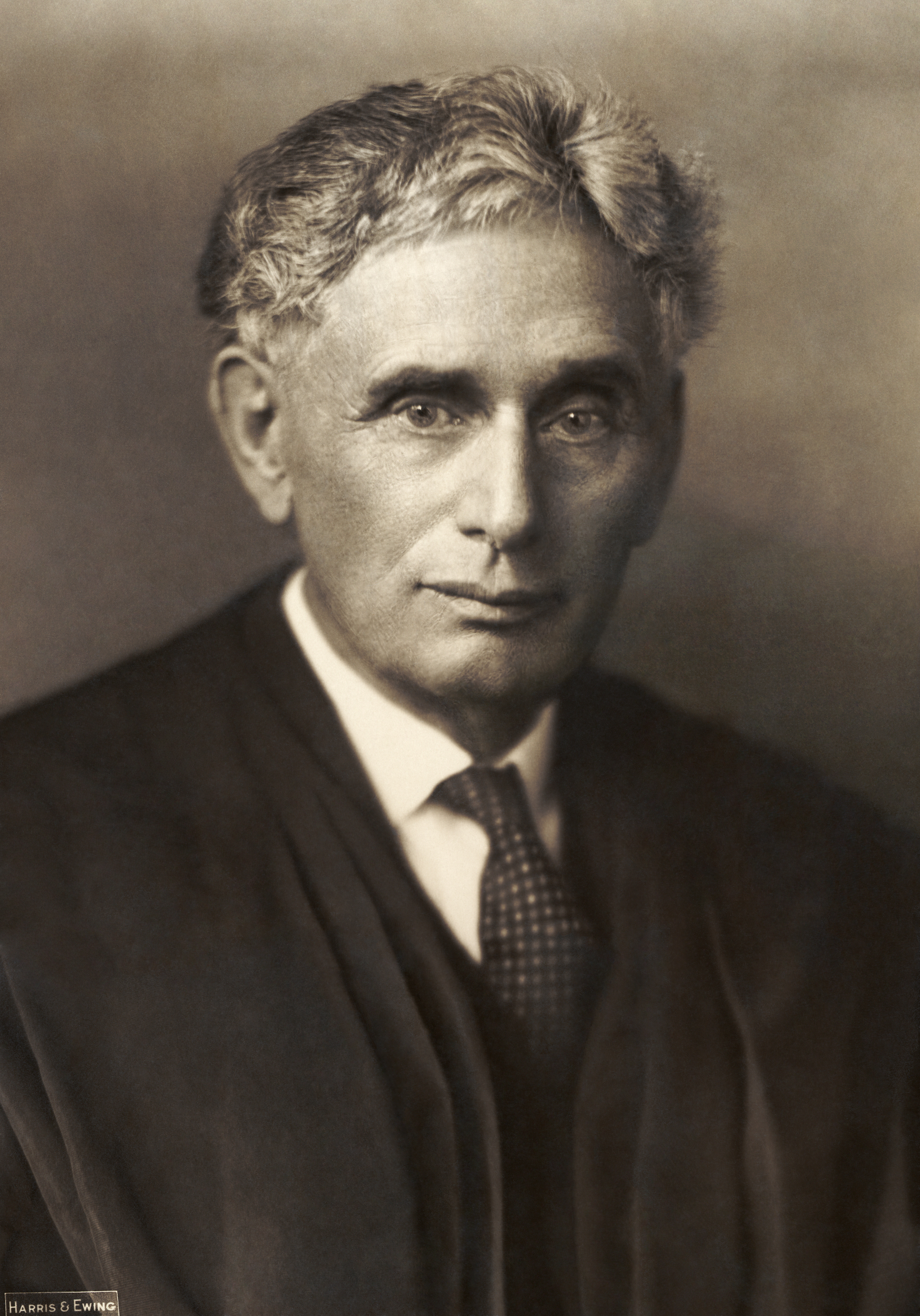
Louis Brandeis

The law firm was founded in 1879 by Harvard Law School classmates Samuel D. Warren II and Louis Brandeis. The firm operated under the name Warren & Brandeis until 1897, although Warren left active practice in 1888 to take over his family's business. William Harrison Dunbar, son of a Harvard professor, joined the firm in 1886, and George Read Nutter joined in 1889. The firm took the name Brandeis Dunbar & Nutter in 1897 and kept that name until 1916. Brandeis himself practiced law with the firm for 35 years until he was nominated to the Supreme Court. As of 2020, the firm now has about 140 lawyers.

== Reputation ==
The Nutter firm claims particular expertise in litigation (especially land-use litigation), intellectual property, technology, business, and real estate law.

Nutter ranked first in Boston and second in the United States in The American Lawyer's 2006 Summer Associate Survey, while the American Lawyer's annual survey of midlevel associates ranked Nutter in the top five firms in the country for two years in a row. In 2007, Nutter ranked #1 nationally and, for a second consecutive year, #1 in Boston in The American Lawyer's annual Summer Associate Survey. Nutter scored 4.989 out of a possible 5 points to achieve the number one ranking. This news complements The American Lawyer's annual survey of midlevel associates, in which Nutter ranked among the top five firms in the country and Boston for the last three years. In 2007, eighteen Nutter partners were selected for the 2007 list of "The Best Lawyers in America." Nutter was recognized as a "Best Law Firm" by U.S. News & World Report and Best Lawyers in their second annual survey, ranking in the top tier nationally for Patent Law and Land Use & Zoning. In addition, Nutter received Tier 1 rankings in Boston in 10 practice areas: Banking and Finance, White Collar Criminal Defense – Governmental Investigations, White Collar Criminal Defense – Litigation, Environmental Law, Land Use & Zoning, Litigation – Environmental, Patent Law, Product Liability Litigation – Defendants, Real Estate Law and Trusts & Estates Law.

== Subsidiaries ==
Nutter has an investment management arm, Nutter Investment Advisors. Nutter Investment Advisors manages over $1.4 billion in funds. As of 2019, the investment management arm is headed by Richard Sipley, who has over two-decades of experience in advising high-net worth families and foundations.

== Partnerships ==
In October 2019, Nutter announced a partnership with Ciprun Global to assist clients in entering the Chinese intellectual property market. As part of this partnership, Nutter will work with Ciprun on American clients that want IP in China, and Ciprun will connect Nutter to Chinese companies seeking IP protection in USA.

== Pro bono ==
The firm's founder, Louis Brandeis, is often credited as a contributor to the development of a pro bono tradition in American legal practice. Nutter is a founding member and challenge participant in the Pro Bono Institute's Law Firm Pro Bono Project.

== Former attorneys ==
- Louis Brandeis, Associate Justice of the US Supreme Court
- Allison D. Burroughs, federal judge
- Norman Byrnes, veteran of two world wars, real estate attorney, philanthropist, championship contract bridge player
- Nathaniel M. Gorton, federal judge
- Robert William Sawyer, journalist and conservationist
- Alan Trustman, lawyer, screenwriter, pari-mutuel operator and currency trader
- Samuel D. Warren II, lawyer
