= Ecstasy (Gill sculpture) =

Sculpture by Eric Gill

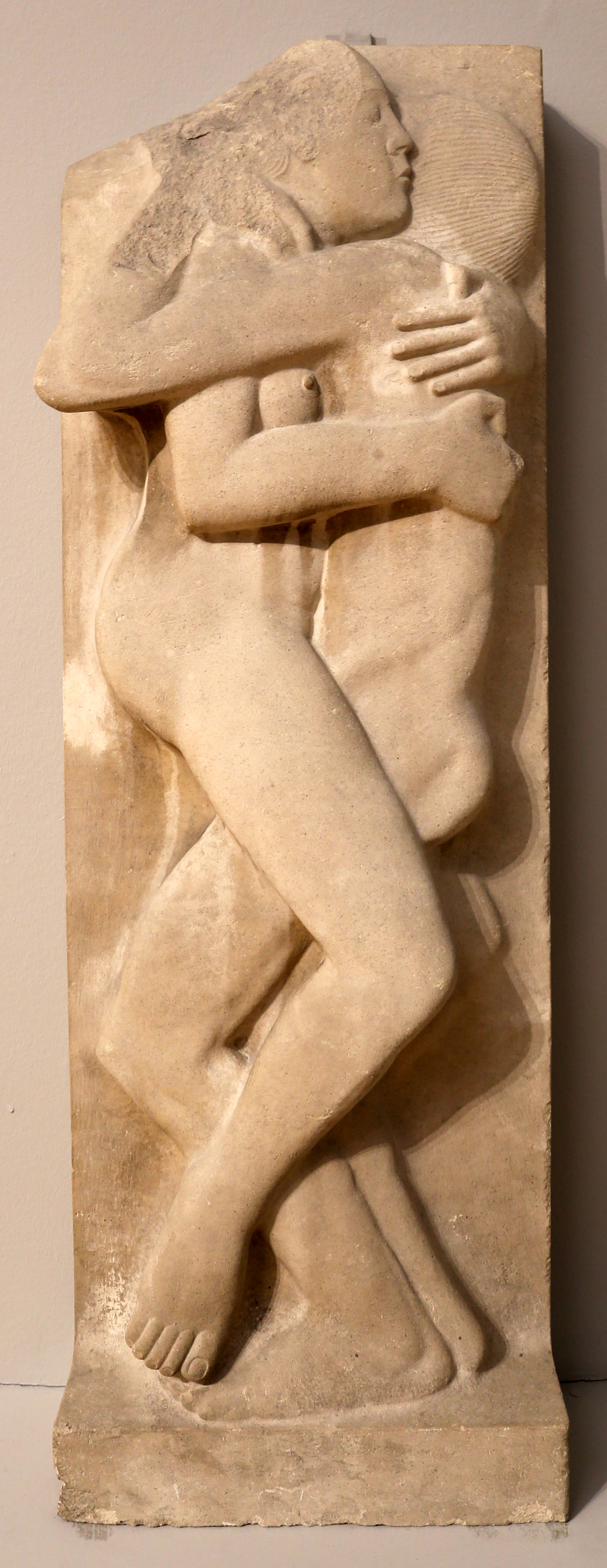
Ecstasy

Ecstasy is a relief sculpture by Eric Gill executed from 1910 to 1911. It depicts a male figure and a female figure, standing and embracing, in the act of copulating. It was acquired by the Tate Gallery in 1982.

Gill found creative links between sex and his Catholic spirituality: a drawing for this work was entitled Christ and the Church. The sculpture also draws inspiration from Indian temple sculptures. It may have been modelled on his sister Gladys and her husband Ernest Laughton. From Gill's diary, it seems that he was working on the sculpture from around August 1910 and completed by February 1911. He refers to the sculpture as "'They' group 'fucking'." Correspondence between Gill and Roger Fry connected the work with two other reliefs, A Crucifix (also in the Tate) and A Roland for an Oliver (also known as Her, held by the University of Hull).

The sculpture is made from Portland stone and measures 54 × 18 × 9 inches (137 × 46 × 23 cm). It bears a monogram on the right edge, of an eye on a hand, a symbol used by Gill in his early carvings. It was acquired from the artist by collector Edward Perry Warren in 1912. Warren also owned a marble replica of Rodin's The Kiss that he had commissioned from the original artist. After Warren's death in 1928 and Gill's death in 1940, the sculpture was sold at Sotheby's in March 1949 by Warren's heir H. Asa Thomas. The work was called They by Gill; it only became known as Ecstasy from the Sotheby's sale in 1949. It was bought by the Tate Gallery from Mrs D Webber in 1982.

The work was accidentally damaged before it was acquired by the Tate Gallery: the top left corner is missing, including the back of the woman's head and the man's left wrist.
