= Charles Beck =

American politician

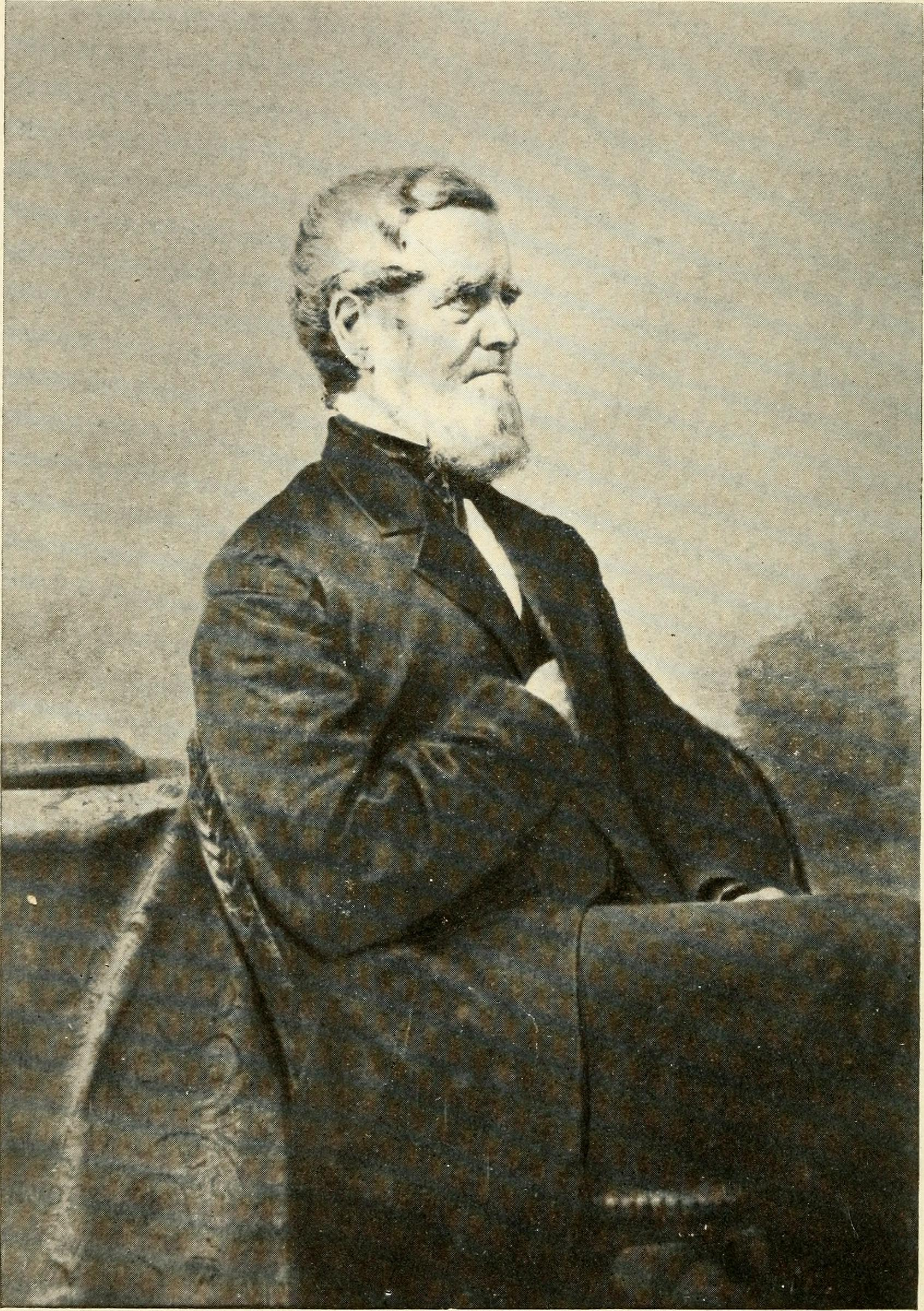
- From a portrait in the library of Harvard University
- Born: August 19, 1798; Heidelberg, Grand Duchy of Baden
- Died: March 19, 1866 (aged 68); Cambridge, Massachusetts, United States

Charles Beck or Karl Beck (August 19, 1798 – March 19, 1866) was a German-born American classical scholar, Harvard professor and friend of Charles Follen.

== Biography ==
Coat of Arms of Charles Beck

Beck was born in Heidelberg. His merchant father died when Beck was young, and his mother married Wilhelm de Wette, a theologian, biblical scholar, and professor in the University of Heidelberg. In 1810, the family moved to Berlin, where de Wette had been appointed professor of theology at the new Prussian university. In Berlin, while a student at the Werdersches Gymnasium, Beck began to frequent the Hasenheide Turnplatz where he became proficient in the arts of a Turner. He took this knowledge to Milwaukee, Wisconsin where the Turner movement was preceded by the first wave of gymnastics in the U.S. in the 1820s at Turner Hall.

Beck studied the classics at the University of Berlin, then theology at the University of Heidelberg where he was ordained, and finally at the University of Tübingen where he was awarded a Ph.D. While a student, he became active in the Burschenschaft movement, and on his graduation found his republican sentiments prevented him from pursuing a career in Germany. Thus he became employed for some time as tutor at the University of Basle in Switzerland, where his stepfather was a professor. After the murder of August von Kotzebue, de Wette had written a letter to the assassin's mother in which he attempted to console her saying her son did the act out of a mistaken sense of duty. On learning of the letter, the Prussian authorities accused him of excusing the assassination, dismissed him from his professorship at Berlin and banished him from Prussia. De Witte lived in retirement a few years, and then in 1822 had become professor of theology at the Basle university.

By 1824, Beck felt his republican sentiments endangered his liberty even in Switzerland, and he took refuge in Paris where he met Charles Follen, another German in a similar situation. The two then left from Le Havre for the United States on 5 November, arriving in New York City on 19 December 1824. Soon afterward Beck became connected, as teacher, with the Round Hill School at Northampton, Massachusetts. There he was appointed teacher of Latin. He also established at Round Hill an outdoor gymnasium: the first gymnasium in the United States, which hosted the first school gymnastics program in that country. He taught physical education classes with a curriculum modeled after Jahn's system, and translated Jahn's 1816 work Deutsche Turnkunst into English as Treatise on Gymnasticks, taken chiefly from the German of F. L. Jahn.

In 1830, he and two other teachers established a school at Philipstown, New York, on the Hudson River, opposite West Point. In 1832 Beck was appointed professor of Latin language and literature at Harvard. He became a member of the American Oriental Society in 1843 and a Fellow of the American Academy of Arts and Sciences in 1845. He was elected to the American Philosophical Society in 1845. On his retirement from Harvard in 1850, he devoted himself to literary pursuits and classical studies. In 1863, he published The Manuscripts of the Satyricon of Petronius Arbiter, described and collated. For two years, he represented Cambridge in the Massachusetts House of Representatives. He was specially interested in the soldiers' fund, the Sanitary Commission, and the agencies for the care and education of the freedmen.

In 1827, he married Louisa A. Henshaw (d. 1830), and in 1831 he married her sister, Teresa H. Phillips (d. 1863). He died in Cambridge, Massachusetts, aged 67.

== See also ==
- Beck-Warren House, a Greek Revival house (now on the Harvard campus) built by Beck in 1833
