= S. D. Warren =

American businessman (1817–1888)

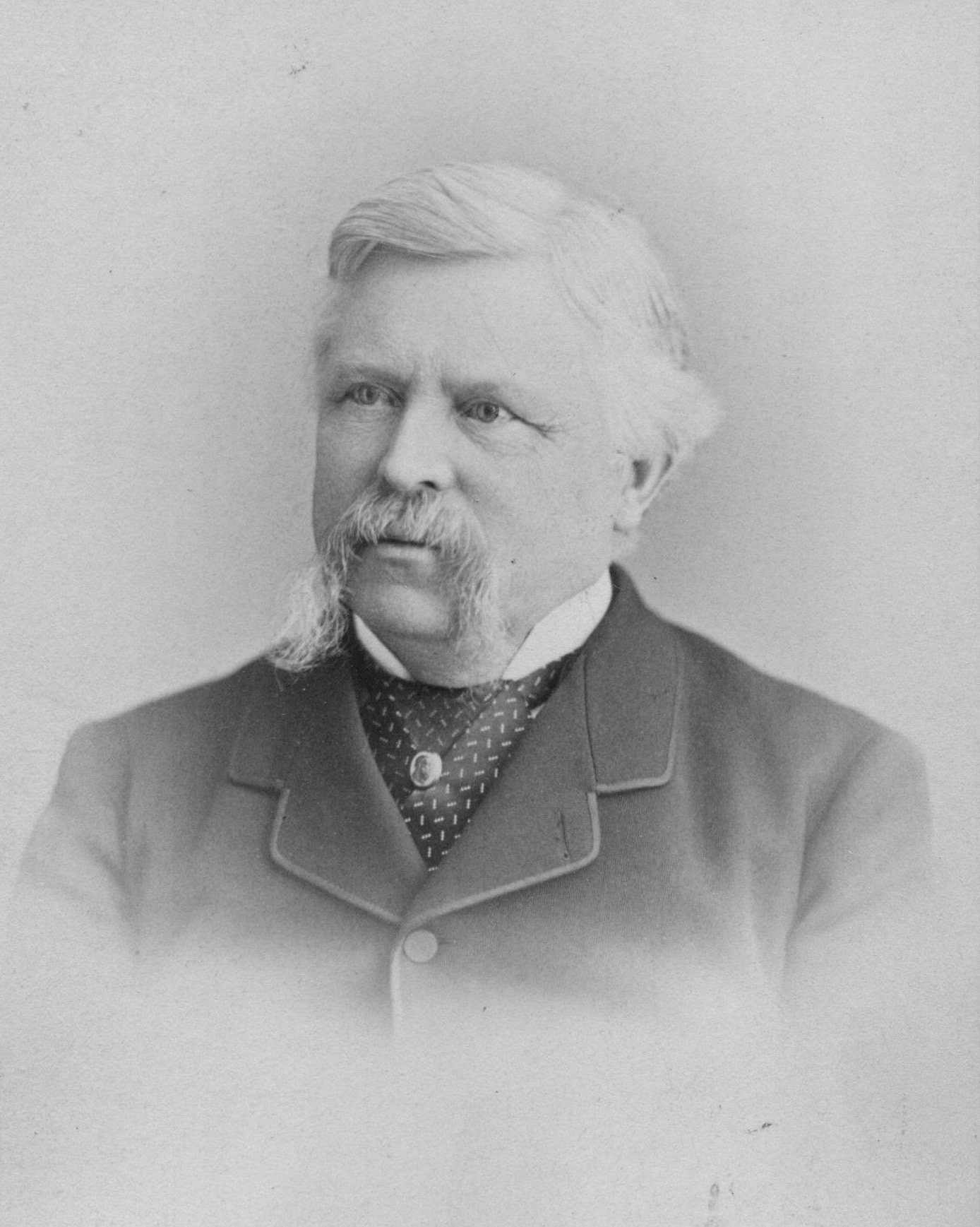
- Portrait by William Notman, circa 1885
- Born: Samuel Dennis Warren; September 13, 1817; Grafton, Massachusetts, U.S.
- Died: May 11, 1888 (aged 70); Boston, Massachusetts, U.S.
- Burial place: Mount Auburn Cemetery
- Occupation: Businessman
- Spouse: Susan Cornelia Clarke (m. 1847)
- Children: Josiah; Samuel II; Henry; Cornelia; Edward; Fiske

Samuel Dennis Warren (September 13, 1817 – May 11, 1888) was an American paper magnate and the founder of the S. D. Warren Paper Mill in Westbrook, Maine. Noted for his benevolence and paternalism, Warren built a commercial block adjacent to the mill, which is named in his honor.

== Early life ==
Warren was born in 1817 in Grafton, Massachusetts.

== Career ==
In the 1850s, Warren began working for his father's Boston-based rag business, when nearly all paper was made from rags. With an increase in the need for paper, not least from the government during the American Civil War, the rag trade dwindled significantly. In 1853, Warren opened his first paper mill, the S. D. Warren Paper Mill, on the Presumpscot River in today's Westbrook, Maine. Recognizing the importance of wood pulp, Warren purchased the Forest Paper Company in Yarmouth in 1873.

== Personal life ==
Warren had four children, all of whom were well-known in their fields. A son, Samuel D. Warren II, was an attorney who co-published an influential article entitled The Right to Privacy in 1890. Daughter Cornelia Warren was an American farmer and an educational and social service philanthropist. Son Henry Clarke Warren was an American scholar of Sanskrit and Pali. Edward Perry Warren was an art collector and the author. Fiske Warren was also involved in the paper business.

== Death ==
Warren died in Boston in 1888, aged 70. He was interred in Mount Auburn Cemetery in Cambridge, Massachusetts.
