= The Right to Privacy (article) =

1890 law review article by Samuel D. Warren II and Louis Brandeis

"The Right to Privacy" (4 Harvard L.R. 193 (Dec. 15, 1890)) is a law review article written by Samuel D. Warren II and Louis Brandeis, and published in the 1890 Harvard Law Review. It is "one of the most influential essays in the history of American law" and is widely regarded as the first publication in the United States to advocate for a right to privacy, articulating that right primarily as a "right to be let alone". It influenced the development of the privacy laws of the United States.

== Article ==
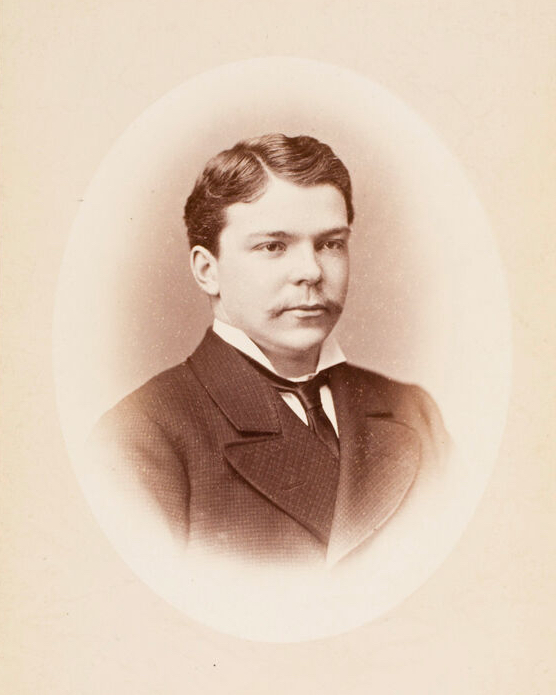
Samuel D. Warren II, c. 1875

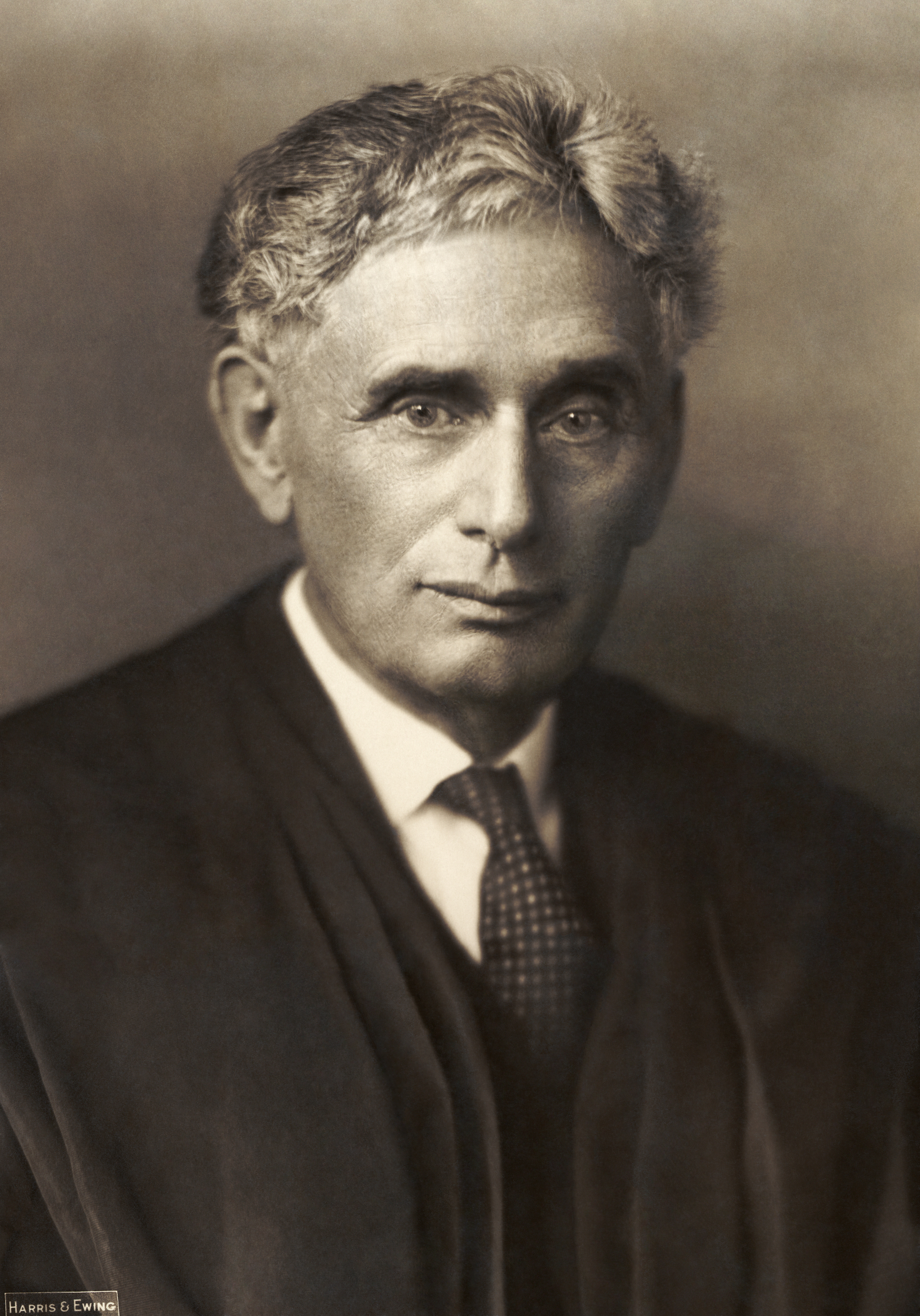
Louis Brandeis, c. 1916

Although credited to both Louis Brandeis and Samuel Warren, the article was apparently written primarily by Brandeis, on a suggestion of Warren based on his "deep-seated abhorrence of the invasions of social privacy." William Prosser, in writing his own influential article on the privacy torts in American law, attributed the specific incident to an intrusion by journalists on a society wedding, but in truth it was inspired by more general coverage of intimate personal lives in society columns of newspapers.

"The Right to Privacy" is brief by modern law review standards, comprising only 7222 words, excluding citations.

=== Introduction and background ===
Warren and Brandeis begin their article by introducing the fundamental principle that "the individual shall have full protection in person and in property." They acknowledge that this is a fluid principle that has been reconfigured over the centuries as a result of political, social, and economic change.

The first three paragraphs of the essay describe the development of the common law with regard to life and property. Originally, the common law "right to life" only provided a remedy for physical interference with life and property. But later, the scope of the "right to life" expanded to recognize the "legal value of sensations." For example, the action of battery—a protection against actual bodily injury—gave rise to the action of assault—fear of actual bodily injury. Similarly, the concept of property expanded from protecting only tangible property to intangible property.

Beginning with the fourth paragraph, Warren and Brandeis explain the desirability and necessity that the common law adapt to recent inventions and business methods—namely, the advent of instantaneous photography and the widespread circulation of newspapers, both of which have contributed to the invasion of an individual's privacy. Warren and Brandeis take this opportunity to excoriate the practices of journalists of their time, particularly aiming at society gossip pages:

The press is overstepping in every direction the obvious bounds of propriety and of decency. Gossip is no longer the resource of the idle and of the vicious, but has become a trade, which is pursued with industry as well as effrontery. To satisfy a prurient taste the details of sexual relations are spread broadcast in the columns of the daily papers. To occupy the indolent, column upon column is filled with idle gossip, which can only be procured by intrusion upon the domestic circle.

=== Defining "privacy" ===
The authors state the purpose of the article: "It is our purpose to consider whether the existing law affords a principle which can properly be invoked to protect the privacy of the individual; and, if it does, what the nature and extent of such protection is."

First, Warren and Brandeis examine the law of slander and libel (forms of defamation) to determine if it adequately protects the privacy of the individual. The authors conclude that this body of law is insufficient to protect the privacy of the individual because it "deals only with damage to reputation." In other words, defamation law, regardless of how widely circulated or unsuited to publicity, requires that the individual suffer a direct effect in his or her interaction with other people. The authors write: "However painful the mental effects upon another of an act, though purely wanton or even malicious, yet if the act itself is otherwise lawful, the suffering inflicted is damnum absque injuria " (a loss or harm from something other than a wrongful act and which occasions no legal remedy).

Second, in the next several paragraphs, the authors examine intellectual property law to determine if its principles and doctrines may sufficiently protect the privacy of the individual. Warren and Brandeis concluded that "the protection afforded to thoughts, sentiments, and emotions, expressed through the medium of writing or of the arts, so far as it consists in preventing publication, is merely an instance of the enforcement of the more general right of the individual to be let alone."

Warren and Brandeis then discuss the origin of what they called a "right to be let alone". They explain that the right of property provides the foundation for the right to prevent publication. But at the time the right of property only protected the right of the creator to any profits derived from the publication. The law did not yet recognize the idea that there was value in preventing publication. As a result, the ability to prevent publication did not clearly exist as a right of property.

The authors proceed to examine case law regarding a person's ability to prevent publication. Warren and Brandeis observed that, although the court in Prince Albert v. Strange asserted that its decision was based on the protection of property, a close examination of the reasoning reveals the existence of other unspecified rights—that is, the right to be let alone.

If this conclusion is correct, then existing law does afford "a principle which may be invoked to protect the privacy of the individual from invasion either by the too enterprising press, the photographer, or the possessor of any other modern device for recording or reproducing scenes or sounds."

Furthermore, Warren and Brandeis suggest the existence of a right to privacy based on the jurisdictional justifications used by the courts to protect material from publication. The article states, "where protection has been afforded against wrongful publication, the jurisdiction has been asserted, not on the ground of property, or at least not wholly on that ground, but upon the ground of an alleged breach of an implied contract or of a trust or confidence."

Warren and Brandeis proceed to point out that: "This protection of implying a term in a contract, or of implying a trust, is nothing more nor less than a judicial declaration that public morality, private justice, and general convenience demand the recognition of such a rule." In other words, the courts created a legal fiction that contracts implied a provision against publication or that a relationship of trust mandated nondisclosure.

Yet, the article raises a problematic scenario where a casual recipient of a letter, who did not solicit the correspondence, opens and reads the letter. Simply by receiving, opening, and reading a letter the recipient does not create any contract or accept any trust.

Warren and Brandeis argue that courts have no justification to prohibit the publication of such a letter, under existing theories or property rights. Rather, they argue, "the principle which protects personal writings and any other productions of the intellect or the emotions, is the right to privacy."

=== Limitations ===
Finally, Warren and Brandeis consider the remedies and limitations of the newly conceived right to privacy. The authors acknowledge that the exact contours of the new theory are impossible to determine, but several guiding principles from tort law and intellectual property law are applicable.

The applicable limitations are:

1. "The right to privacy does not prohibit any publication of matter which is of public or general interest." Warren and Brandeis elaborate on this exception to the right to privacy by stating:
  In general, then, the matters of which the publication should be repressed may be described as those which concern the private life, habits, acts, and relations of an individual, and have no legitimate connection with his fitness for a public office which he seeks or for which he is suggested, . . . and have no legitimate relation to or bearing upon any act done by him in a public or quasi public capacity.
2. The right to privacy does not prohibit the communication of any matter, though in its nature private, when the publication is made under circumstances which would render it a privileged communication according to the law of slander and libel.
3. The law would probably not grant any redress for the invasion of privacy by oral publication in the absence of special damage.
4. The right to privacy ceases upon the publication of the facts by the individual, or with his consent.
5. The truth of the matter published does not afford a defense.
6. The absence of "malice" in the publisher does not afford a defense.

With regard to remedies, a plaintiff may institute an action for tort damages as compensation for injury or, alternatively, request an injunction.

As a closing note, Warren and Brandeis suggest that criminal penalties should be imposed for violations of the right to privacy, but the pair decline to further elaborate on the matter, deferring instead to the authority of the legislature.

== Reception and influence ==
The article "immediately" received a strong reception and continues to be a touchstone of modern discussions of privacy law.

Roscoe Pound noted in 1916, some 25 years after the essay's publication, that Warren and Brandeis were responsible for "nothing less than adding a chapter to our law." Some decades later, in a highly cited article of his own, Melville B. Nimmer described Warren and Brandeis' essay as "perhaps the most famous and certainly the most influential law review article ever written", attributing the recognition of the common law right of privacy by some 15 state courts in the United States directly to "The Right to Privacy". In 1960, William L. Prosser's article "Privacy" (itself enormously influential in the field), described the circumstances of the article and its importance thusly:

The matter came to a head when the newspapers had a field day on the occasion of the wedding of a daughter, and Mr. Warren became annoyed. It was an annoyance for which the press, the advertisers and the entertainment industry of America were to pay dearly over the next seventy years. Mr. Warren turned to his recent law partner, Louis D. Brandeis, who was destined not to be unknown to history. The result was a noted article, The Right to Privacy, in the Harvard Law Review, upon which the two men collaborated. It has come to be regarded as the outstanding example of the influence of legal periodicals upon the American law.

Contemporary scholar Neil M. Richards notes that this article and Brandeis' dissent in Olmstead v. United States together "are the foundation of American privacy law". Richards and Daniel Solove note that Warren and Brandeis popularized privacy with the article, giving credit to William Prosser for being privacy law's chief architect but calling for privacy law to "regain some of Warren and Brandeis's dynamism." The Olmstead decision was later overruled in the Katz v. United States court ruling.
