= Samuel D. Warren II =

American lawyer and businessman (1852–1910)

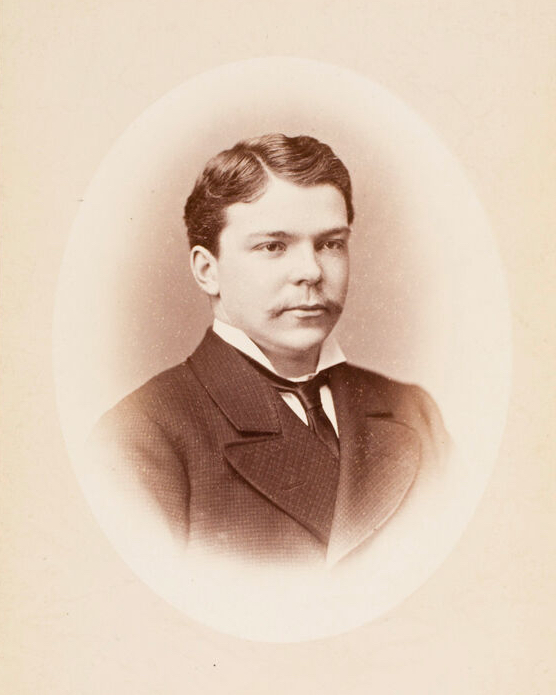
- Born: January 25, 1852; Boston, Massachusetts, U.S.
- Died: February 18, 1910 (aged 58); Dedham, Massachusetts, U.S.
- Burial place: Mount Auburn Cemetery
- Education: Harvard University (AB, LLB, AM)
- Occupations: Lawyer; businessman
- Spouse: Mabel Bayard (m. 1883)
- Children: 6
- Father: S. D. Warren
- Relatives: Frederick Fiske Warren (brother); Henry Clarke Warren (brother); Edward Perry Warren (brother); Cornelia Lyman Warren (sister)

Samuel Dennis Warren II (January 25, 1852 – February 18, 1910) was an American lawyer and businessman from Boston, Massachusetts.

== Early life ==
Warren was born in Boston on January 25, 1852, the son of Susan Cornelia (née Clarke) and Samuel Dennis Warren. His father and namesake founded the Cumberland Paper Mills in Maine. He had four siblings: Henry Clarke Warren, scholar of Sanskrit and Pali; Cornelia Lyman Warren, philanthropist; Edward Perry Warren, art collector; and Fredrick Fiske Warren, political radical and utopist.

Warren graduated from the Boston Latin School, after which he entered Harvard College, earning his undergraduate degree in 1875. He graduated second in his class at Harvard Law School in 1877. The first-place student was his friend Louis Brandeis, later a justice of the United States Supreme Court. Warren was editor of The Harvard Crimson.

== Career ==
Warren and Brandeis founded the prominent Boston law firm of Nutter McClennen & Fish in 1879. At the end of 1890 they published their famous law review article "The Right to Privacy" in the Harvard Law Review. It is "one of the most influential essays in the history of American law" and is widely regarded as the first publication in the United States to advocate a right to privacy, articulating that right primarily as a "right to be let alone" which referred to paragraph 11 of the 1868 law of the press of France. Brandeis later acknowledged that the idea for the essay originated with Warren's "deep-seated abhorrance of the invasions of social privacy" on the part of the press.

In 1899, he left law to oversee the family's paper production business. He managed the family trust established in May 1889 with the legal assistance of Brandeis to benefit his father's widow and five children. In 1906, Warren's brothers Edward and Fiske charged that Brandeis had structured the trust to benefit Samuel at the expense of his siblings.

== Personal life ==
Warren married Mabel Bayard, the eldest daughter of United States Senator from Delaware Thomas F. Bayard, at the Church of the Ascension in Washington, D.C., on January 25, 1883. The couple went on to have six children.

Warren served from 1902 to 1906 as president of the trustees of the Museum of Fine Arts, Boston.

Warren committed suicide by firearm at his Dedham, Massachusetts, country home on the night of February 18, 1910, putting to an end the dispute over the family trust. His family disguised his suicide and the date of his death. The New York Times reported that he died of apoplexy on February 20. Following a funeral service at his Boston residence, he was buried in Mount Auburn Cemetery on February 23.

The Warren Trust case became a point of contention during the 1916 Senate hearings on the confirmation of Brandeis to the Supreme Court, and it remains important for its explication of legal ethics and professional responsibility.
