= Norman Byrnes (lawyer) =

American real estate attorney and champion contract bridge player

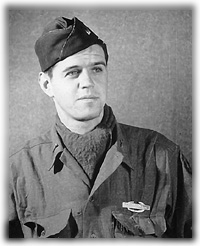
Byrnes as an infantryman the mid 1940s

Norman Thomas Byrnes (December 15, 1922 – July 9, 2009) was a 20th-century American attorney and public citizen of Boston, Massachusetts.

Byrnes was born in Waterville, New York, on December 15, 1922. He was one of 12 children (one of his siblings being professor and author Robert Byrnes) and grew up in relative poverty. He was graduated from Harvard College then fought in Western and Central Europe in World War II, where he earned a Bronze Star Medal and a battlefield commission as an officer. He was graduated from Harvard Law School in 1948 after which he was a prominent real estate attorney for 53 years. He practiced at the law firms of Gaston Snow and its predecessor firms, then was later of counsel to Boyd, MacCrellish & Wheeler, later retiring, in 2001, from of counsel to Nutter McClennen & Fish, which he'd joined in 1993.

In 1981–1982 Byrnes was president of the Massachusetts Conveyancers Association (now called the Real Estate Bar Association for Massachusetts) and received that organization's Richard B. Johnson Award in 1986. He was also president of Boston's Abstract Club and a founding member of the American College of Real Estate Lawyers. He helped develop air rights for the construction of the Prudential Center, and played a major role in the development of the Federal Reserve Bank Building in Boston (he also served as Senior Vice President of the Federal Reserve Bank of Boston from 1971 to 1973).

In 1977, Byrnes was a founder of the Boston Natural Areas Network (then called the Boston Natural Areas Fund), a nonprofit dedicated to preservation of urban wilds in the Boston area. He also served as president of the organization. He was president of Massachusetts Half-Way Houses, a charity providing social integration assistance to released prisoners.

== Personal life ==
Byrnes was an expert contract bridge player and Bronze Life Master, and was president of the New England Bridge Conference. He was married twice and had three children and three stepchildren.

Byrnes died on July 9, 2009, in Clearwater, Florida.

== Publications ==
• Byrnes, Norman; Mitchell, Beth (2010) [1883]. "Restrictions and Indefinite References". In Armstrong, Lauren D. (ed.). Crocker's Notes on Common Forms (9th ed.). Boston: MCLE. ISBN 978-1575896007.

• Byrnes, Norman (2002). "Massachusetts Law Firm Culture". In Kass, Rudolph (ed.). Legal Chowder: Lawyering and Judging in Massachusetts. Boston: MCLE. pp. 68–72. ISBN 9781575891569.

• Byrnes, Norman (principle drafter) – Massachusetts Acts of 1961 An Act to Protect Land Titles from Uncertain and Obsolete Restrictions and to Provide Proceedings in Equity with Respect Thereto (PDF) (Act, Paragraph 448). May 10, 1961.Enacted as Massachusetts General Laws Chapter 184 Sections 26–30
