= John Fothergill (innkeeper) =

English inkeeper (1876–1957)

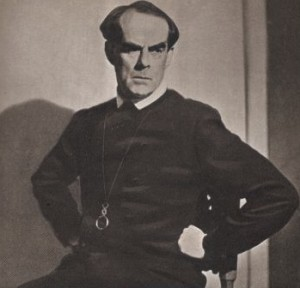
John Fothergill in the 1920s

John Rowland Fothergill (1876–1957) was an English innkeeper and entrepreneur, described as a "pioneer amateur innkeeper" in Who's Who.

== Biography ==
John Rowland Fothergill was born in Kent in 1876, his family originating from Westmorland and Caerleon. He studied at St John's College, Oxford, the Slade School of Fine Art and the London School of Architecture. His contemporaries at the Slade included Augustus John and William Rothenstein.

In 1898, Fothergill and Rothenstein opened the Carfax Gallery on 24 Bury Street, St James's with managerial assistance from Arthur Clifton and Robert Sickert (brother of Walter Sickert) and financial support from Edward Perry Warren. The gallery became Walter Sickert's chief dealer in England. William Bruce Ellis Ranken held his first exhibition at the gallery. Fothergill subsequently became one of Warren's biographers.

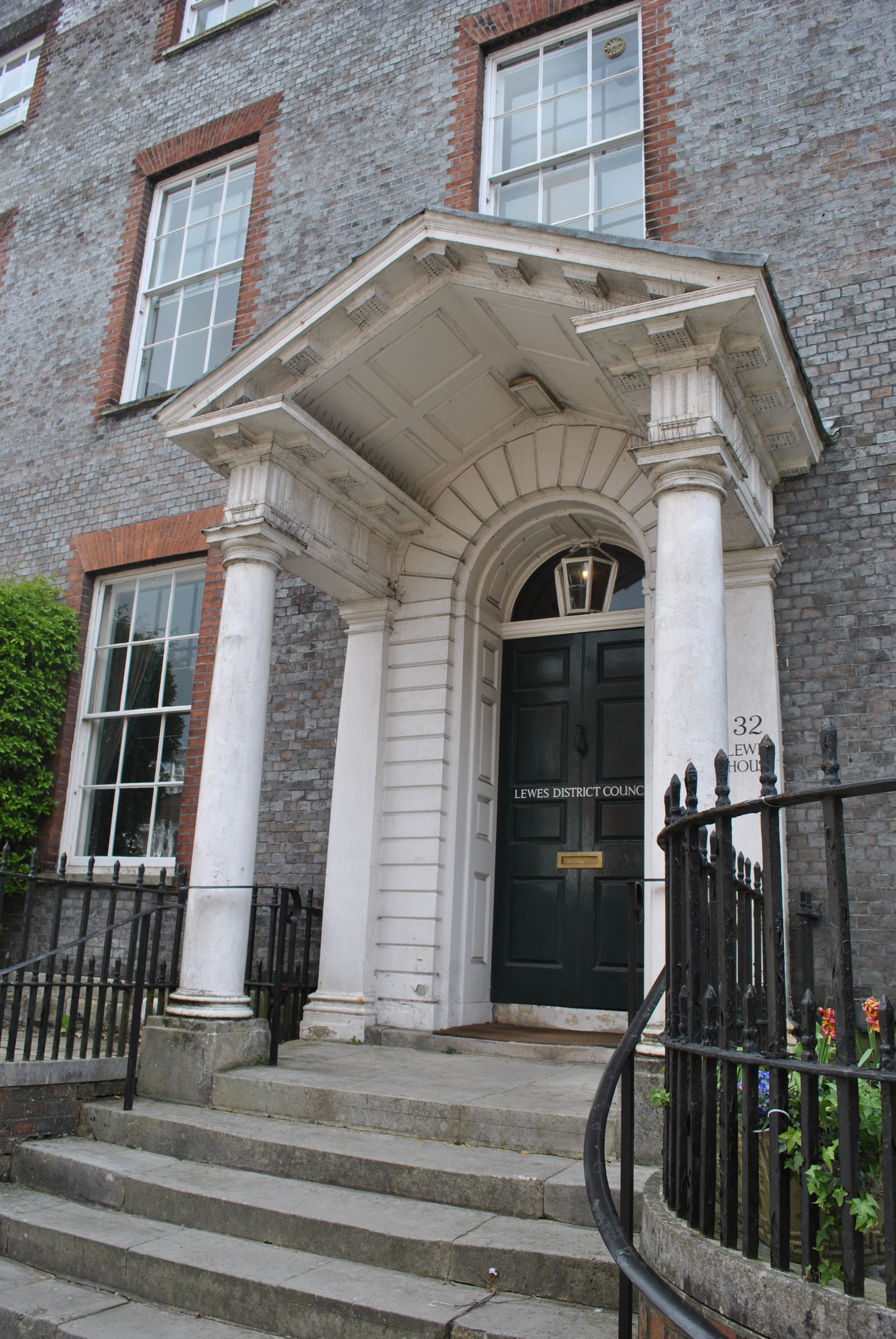
Lewes House, 2017

Fothergill bought a large Tudor oak table for £25 that was installed in the dining room at Warren's home, Lewes House. Upon Warren's death, it sold for £2,100 (£114,063 in 2025). Fothergill was left £20,000 (£1,086,315 in 2025) by Warren. His book, Confessions of an Innkeeper was dedicated to Warren's partner and main beneficiary.

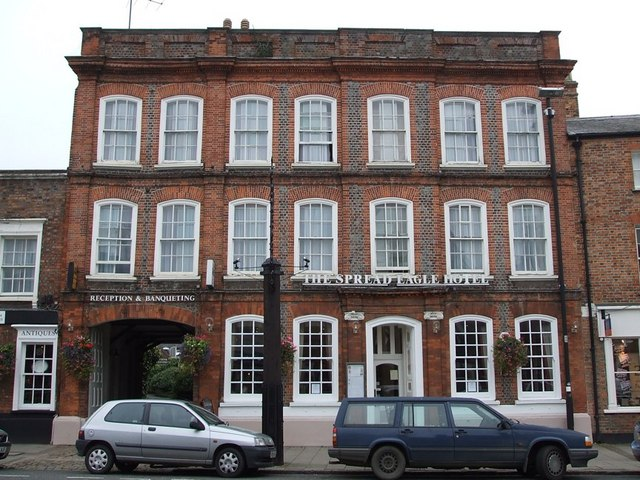
The Spread Eagle Hotel, managed by Fothergill in the 1920s

In 1922, Fothergill bought the Spread Eagle Hotel in Thame and turned it into a success through the decade before it closed in 1931. The pub was regularly visited by Evelyn Waugh and associates, and is mentioned in Brideshead Revisited. Waugh gave Fothergill a copy of his first novel, Decline and Fall, in which he wrote, "John Fothergill, Oxford's only civilizing influence." Fothergill hid the copy in the inn's toilet to avoid theft. Harold Acton also visited the inn and namechecked Fothergill in his memoirs, Memoirs of an Aesthete. Fothergill praised Acton's novel, Humdrum, saying that it "might have been written by the young Wilde." Fothergill's book, My Three Inns recommends Acton's autobiography at the end.

Under Fothergill's and his wife Kate's management, the Spread Eagle became a destination restaurant, attracting patrons from Oxford, London, and beyond, unusual in England in the 1920s and 1930s.

Following the Spread Eagle, Fothergill managed the Royal Ascot Hotel and the Three Swans at Market Harborough. He gravitated around the Bright Young Things group, in the meaning that this crowd attended the venues managed by Fothergill. He was praised for his cooking and innkeeping skills that helped to improve overall dining standards in Britain. Although written during World War Two and the height of rationing, John Fothergill's Cookery Book (1943) is a treasure trove of creative recipes grounded in his understanding and appreciation of English culinary heritage. Two highly regarded desserts at Fothergill's establishments were the Mavrodaphne Trifle and the Thame Tart. Of the Mavrodaphne Trifle, Fothergill wrote, "When I first started innkeeping, thinking round for all the good things I'd had abroad, I sent for a load of Mavrodaphne wine that was so delicious in Greece because, I suppose, the only other wine, Rezinata, tasted of violin strings. . . . Split a sponge sandwich into three. Spread each slice with raspberry jam, custard and Mavrodaphne. Cover with whipped cream." The Thame Tart's headnote read, "Neither I nor Thame nor the late Lady Jekyll (in her delightful Kitchen Essays) invented this tart, but since tens of thousands of people have eaten it with me as 'Thame Tart', it would seem to have earned the title." The recipe involved spreading a short-crust pastry with raspberry jam, a layer of lemon curd, and a topping of whipped cream. Fothergill, in his 1931 An Innkeeper's Diary, credited his wife, Kate, with making the trifle on a regular basis and one summer making up nine hundred pounds of jam.

Fothergill was a close friend of Robbie Ross and Reginald Turner. When he was 19, he met Oscar Wilde who, when he was released from prison in 1897, presented Fothergill with an inscribed copy of The Ballad of Reading Gaol.

== Publications ==
- The Fothergill Omnibus (1931)
- An Innkeeper's Diary (1931)
- Confessions of an Innkeeper (1938)
- John Fothergill's Cookery Book (1943)
- My Three Inns (1949)
