= S. D. Warren Paper Mill =

- Cumberland Mills Historic District
- U.S. National Register of Historic Places
- U.S. Historic district
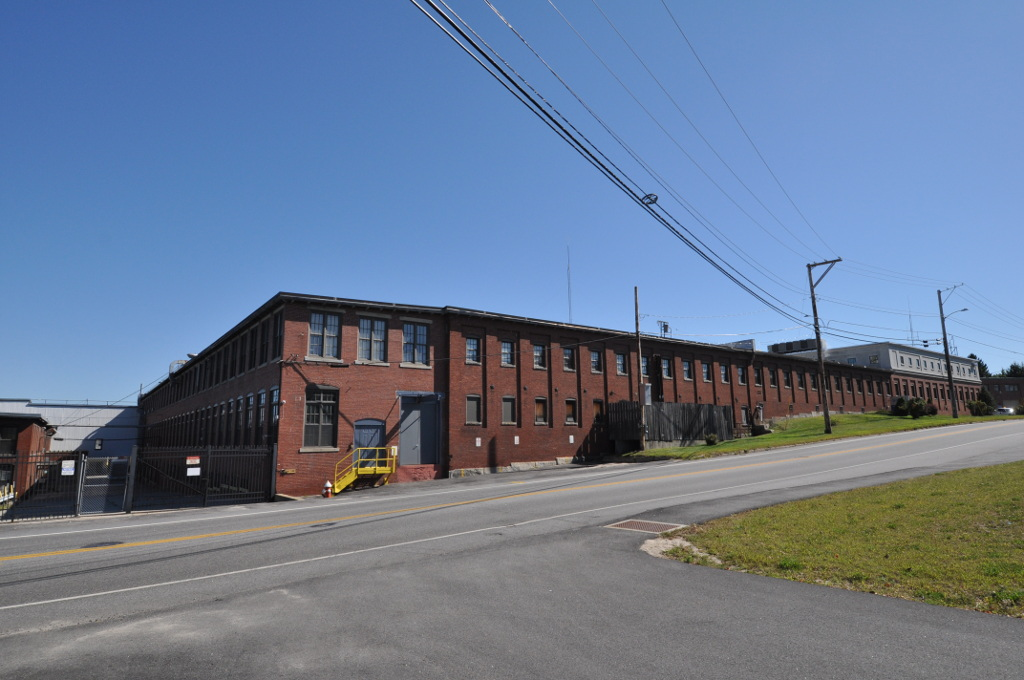
- Pictured in 2014

- Location within Maine Location within the United States
- Location: Both sides of the Presumpscot River between railroad tracks and Warren Avenue, Westbrook, Maine
- Coordinates: 43°41′04″N 70°21′13″W
- Area: 110 acres (45 ha)
- Architect: John Calvin Stevens & Francis H. Fassett
- Architectural style: Queen Anne, Shingle-style
- NRHP reference No.: 74000316
- Added to NRHP: May 2, 1974

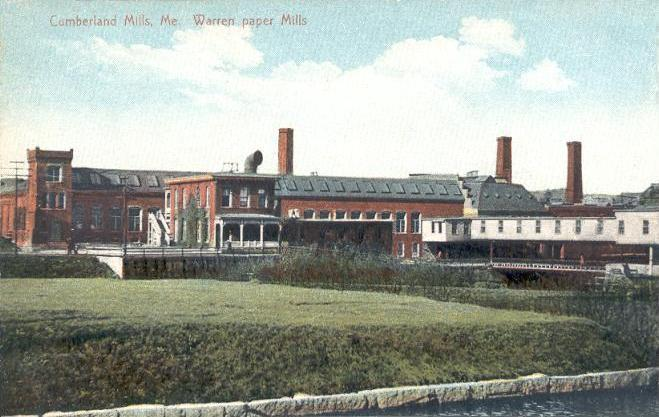
S.D. Warren Paper Mill in c. 1910

The S. D. Warren Paper Mill is a paper mill on the Presumpscot River in Westbrook, Maine. It is now owned by SAPPI Limited, a South African paper concern. It is one of Westbrook's major employers. The mill complex and former worker and management housing associated with the mill's operation in the 19th century were listed on the National Register of Historic Places in 1974 as the Cumberland Mills Historic District.

== History ==
The Warren paper mill is a large sprawling industrial complex spanning the Presumpscot River just north of Cumberland Street in central eastern Westbrook. A paper mill was established on this site in the 1730s, when it was a rural and fairly unpopulated area. In 1854, that small paper mill, in the soon-to-be established town of Westbrook, was purchased for $28,000 by Samuel D. Warren, known as S. D. Warren, (Note: Born September 13, 1817; died May 11, 1888.) uncle of George W. Hammond, who also worked there. The mill was named Grant, Warren and Company. In that year, the mill was only running two paper machines and had a production output of about 3,000 pounds of paper per day. Nine years later in 1863, an additional machine was added to the mill, and the production increased to 11,000 pounds per day.

In 1854, paper was made by beating down rags and using the pulp from the rags. In 1867, after the mill changed its name to S. D. Warren Paper Mill Company, Warren decided to add wood fibers with rags fibers for paper. It was the first mill in the United States to do so. The mill became the largest in the world. By 1880, the mill produced 35,000 pounds of paper per day.

Warren died in 1888 and was succeeded by his son, also Samuel D. Warren II, who managed the business until his death in 1910. The mill continued to grow through the 20th century, employing close to 3,000 Westbrook residents. Scott Paper Company diversified its operations through the purchase of S. D. Warren in 1967. Scott Paper Company operated the S.D. Warren Company as a wholly owned subsidiary until 1994, when it sold this leading producer of lightweight and heavyweight coated papers. In 1995, SAPPI Limited, a paper company based in South Africa paid $300 million for the mill and outsourced most of the work in the mill to South Africa. The mill now only employs about 300 people, but continues to be a presence in the city of Westbrook.

The mill property and a number of surrounding properties were listed on the National Register of Historic Places in 1974. Included in this listing were the mill itself, a row of Shingle style worker housing on Brown Street (from designs by John Calvin Stevens and Andrew Jackson Downing), and the elaborate Queen Anne Victorian home of Warren's son John, located across Cumberland Street from the mill.

== Rail facilities ==
Cumberland Mills was served by the Portland and Ogdensburg Railroad (later Maine Central Railroad) and the Portland and Rochester Railroad (later Boston and Maine Railroad). Horse-drawn wagons transferred freight between the mill and the railroads. The wagons rode on 2 ft (610 mm) narrow gauge rails after 1874. Steam locomotives replaced the horses in 1895. The first three locomotives weighed 7 tons each, and carried 200 gallons of water. The locomotives were originally oil fueled; but were converted to burn coal after three employees died in an oil fire during refueling in 1921. Pulpwood was transported into the mill in 20-foot-long cars carrying 2 cords of pulpwood. There were 110 pulpwood cars in 1938 and the mill consumed 180 cords of pulpwood per day. Narrow gauge locomotives transferred 250 tons of coal per day to the mill boilers and transported ash from the boilers to a disposal pile.

The mill also used standard gauge locomotives after spur tracks were extended onto the mill property. The last standard gauge locomotive was sold to the Maine Central Railroad when Portland Terminal Company took over millyard switching work in 1929. The last 2 ft (610 mm) gauge locomotives were sold in 1949 after conveyor systems were constructed to transport materials formerly moved in narrow gauge cars.

=== Locomotives ===
Number	Gauge	Builder	Type	Date	Works number	Notes
1	2 ft (610 mm)	Baldwin Locomotive Works	0-4-0T	1895	14283	reboilered 1926 sold 1949 New Jersey amusement park to Boothbay Railway Museum 1971
2	2 ft (610 mm)	Baldwin Locomotive Works	0-4-0T	1896	14522	reboilered 1926 sold 1949 New Jersey amusement park to Boothbay Railway Museum 1971
3	2 ft (610 mm)	Baldwin Locomotive Works	0-4-0T	1905		dismantled for parts to keep #1 & #2 operating
4	standard		0-4-0			ex-Boston and Maine Railroad acquired 1896 retired 1910
5	standard		0-4-0			ex-Boston and Maine Railroad #465
6	standard					
7	standard		0-4-0			ex-Pennsylvania Railroad
8	2 ft (610 mm)	Davenport Locomotive Works	0-4-0T	1914		
9	standard	American Locomotive Company	0-6-0	1924		sold to Maine Central Railroad #189 in 1929

== See also ==
- Cumberland and Oxford Canal
