= Spring family =

Arms granted during the reign of King Henry VIII (1509–1547) to "Thomas Spring of Lavenham": Argent, on a chevron between three mascles gules as many cinquefoils or

The Spring family is a Suffolk gentry family that has been involved in the politics and economy of East Anglia since the 15th century, as well as holding large estates in Ireland from the 16th century.

== History ==
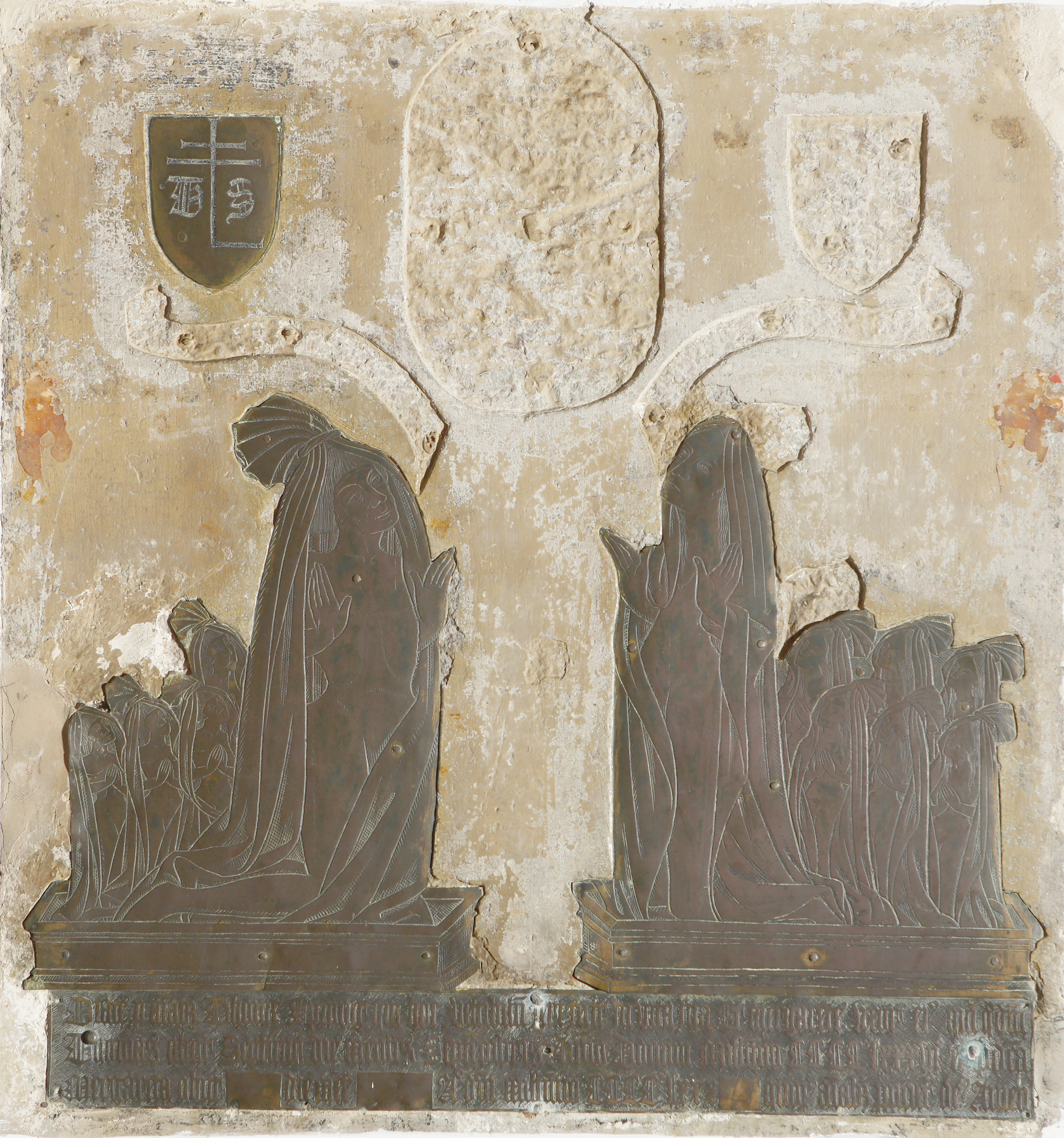
Brass of Thomas Spring (d. 1486), father of Thomas Spring ("The rich clothier"), and his wife Margaret.

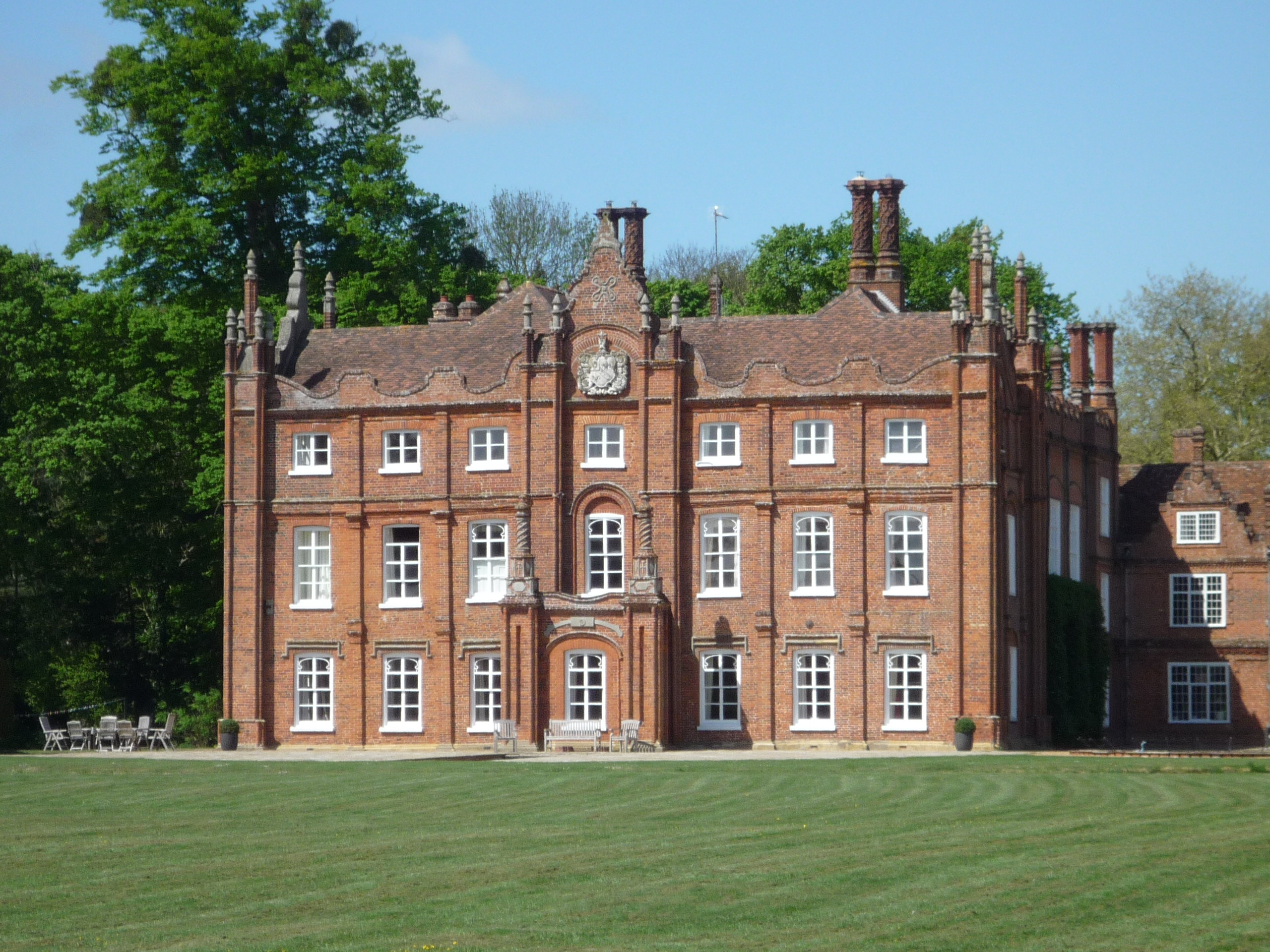
Cockfield Hall, one of the seats of the Spring family for several generations

The earliest recording of the family is in 1311 in northern England, where Sir Henry Spring was lord of the manor at a place that would become known as Houghton-le-Spring. The family first came to prominence in the town of Lavenham in Suffolk, where they were important merchants in the cloth and wool trade during the fifteenth and sixteenth centuries. At the height of the wool trade in the late 15th century, the Springs were one of the richest families in England. The family owned over two dozen manor houses in the counties of Suffolk, Norfolk, Cambridgeshire and Essex, including Cockfield Hall, which they built in the 16th century, and Newe House. The most successful of the Spring merchants was Thomas Spring (c. 1474–1523), who was the first member of the Suffolk Springs to hold public office. Thomas Spring gave substantial funds for the construction of St Peter and St Paul's Church, Lavenham, where he lies buried.

Over following generations, the Springs firmly established themselves as gentry in Suffolk. This was partly facilitated through a series of advantageous marriages to powerful local families, such as the Waldegraves, Jermyns and de Veres. Additionally, successive generations of the family held public office, representing Suffolk in the House of Commons and occupying the role of High Sheriff of Suffolk. Despite being relations of the Yorkist George Plantagenet, 1st Duke of Clarence, the Springs were supporters of the House of Lancaster throughout the Wars of the Roses, reflected by the grant of arms to the family by Henry VI. Sir John Spring (d.1549) was knighted by Henry VII and aided the dukes of Norfolk and Suffolk in suppressing the Lavenham revolt of 1525. His son, Sir William, became High Sheriff of Suffolk in 1578 having served as MP for Suffolk and was knighted by Elizabeth I. His grandson was knighted by James I, also serving as MP and High Sheriff of Suffolk. During this period, the Springs were committed Puritans and under their patronage Cockfield became a centre for Puritan thought and activity.

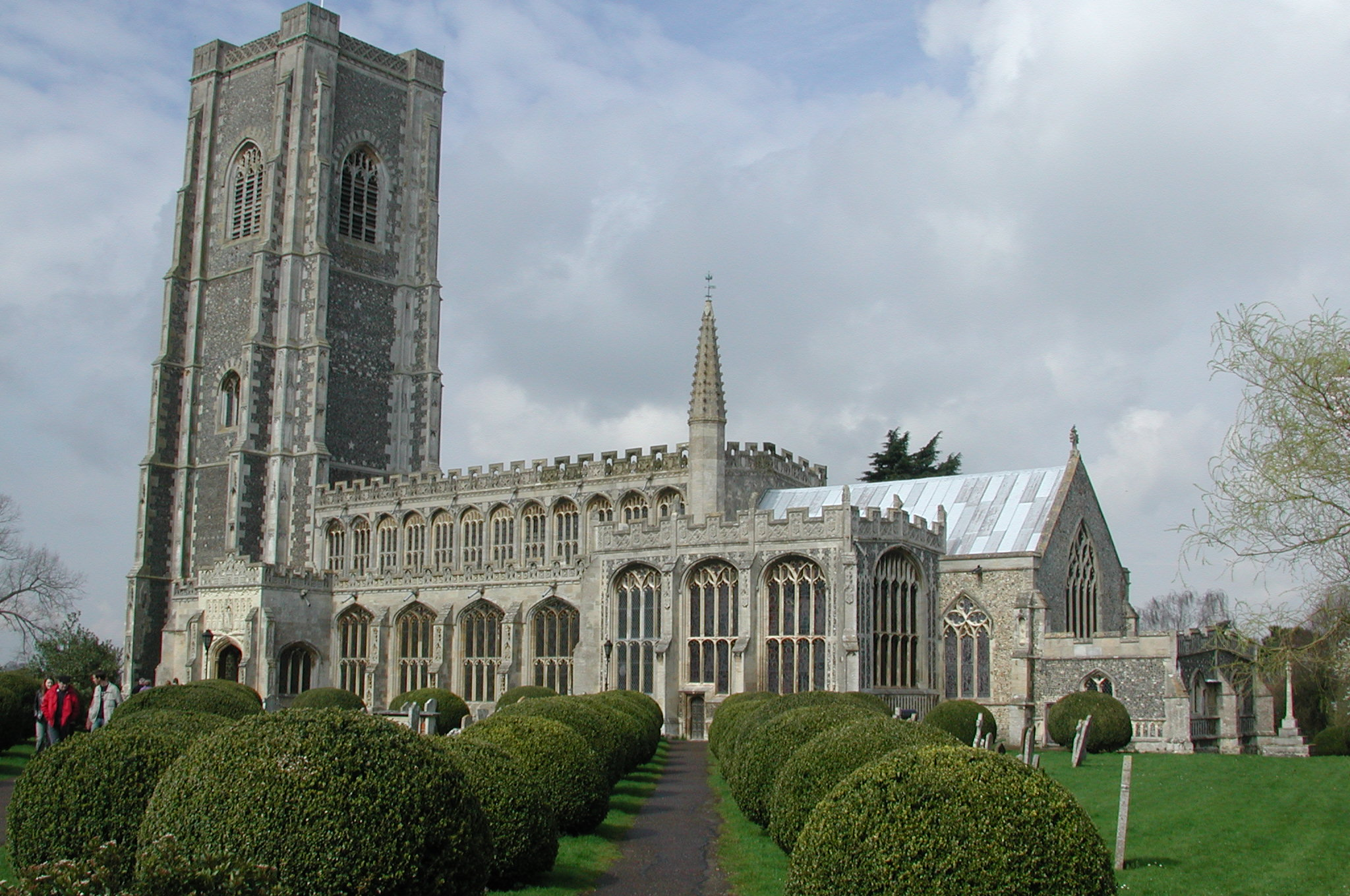
Church of St Peter and Paul, Lavenham, Suffolk, built with money from the Spring family

On 11 August 1641, Sir William Spring was created a baronet, of Pakenham in the County of Suffolk, in the Baronetage of England by King Charles I, in an attempt by the king to win the favour of Parliamentarian gentry families in the lead up to the Civil War. He was High Sheriff of Suffolk and later served as MP for Bury St Edmunds and Suffolk, and was an active recruiter for the Parliamentarian army during the war. Following the Restoration of the monarchy in 1660, the family was issued with a pardon for their actions against the king. Sir William's son, the second baronet, was also the MP for Suffolk and one of the earliest members to be designated a Whig. The family title became dormant on the death of the sixth baronet in 1769.

The Conservative politician Lord Risby (b.1946) is the most recent member of the family to represent Suffolk in the British Parliament. Other members of the family include the British Army officers Lieutenant-Colonel William Spring (1769–c. 1839), Brigadier-General Frederick Spring (1878–1963), Major Trevor Spring (1882–1926) and Lieutenant-Colonel Kenneth Spring (1921–1997). Flying Officer Hector Spring DFC (1915–1978) served with distinction in the Royal Air Force during World War II.

The family have a monument erected to them in the church of St Peter and St Paul in Lavenham and the parclose screen in the north aisle is to their chantry. Additional monuments to the family exist in Cockfield and Pakenham, as well as on Ullswater in the Lake District.

=== Springs in Ireland ===
In 1578, Captain Thomas Spring, the great-grandson of Thomas Spring of Lavenham, settled in Ireland as the Constable of Castlemaine, where there was a small English garrison. The Crown granted him over 3,000 acres of land in County Kerry and elsewhere in Munster, including Killagha Abbey. The family's secure financial position facilitated marriages with several Old English Munster dynasties. Another descendant, Walter Spring, married a daughter of the Knight of Kerry and was involved in the Irish Confederate Wars, consequently forfeiting much of his land. His descendants married into the Anglo-Irish Rice family, establishing the Spring Rice family. This branch was raised to the peerage as Barons Monteagle of Brandon, after the Whig politician Thomas Spring Rice had served as Chancellor of the Exchequer. The Spring Rices owned 6,445 acres in County Limerick, 2,000 acres in County Kerry and a further 2,000 acres elsewhere in Ireland. The second Lord Monteagle was a Liberal Unionist politician who helped to found the Irish Dominion League. Future generations sat in the House of Lords as both Liberals and Conservatives until the passing of the House of Lords Act 1999. Sir Cecil Spring Rice (1859–1918) was the British ambassador to the United States during the First World War, while his cousin, Thomas Spring Rice, 3rd Baron Monteagle of Brandon held minor diplomatic office. The 3rd Baron's sister was the Irish nationalist activist, Mary Spring Rice. The sixth baron, Gerald Spring Rice (1926–2013) was an officer in the Irish Guards.

The civil servant Sir Francis Spring (1849–1933), the army officer Lieutenant-Colonel Francis Spring Walker (1876-1941) and the Irish politician Dick Spring (b.1950) are also descended from the same family.

== Motto and arms ==
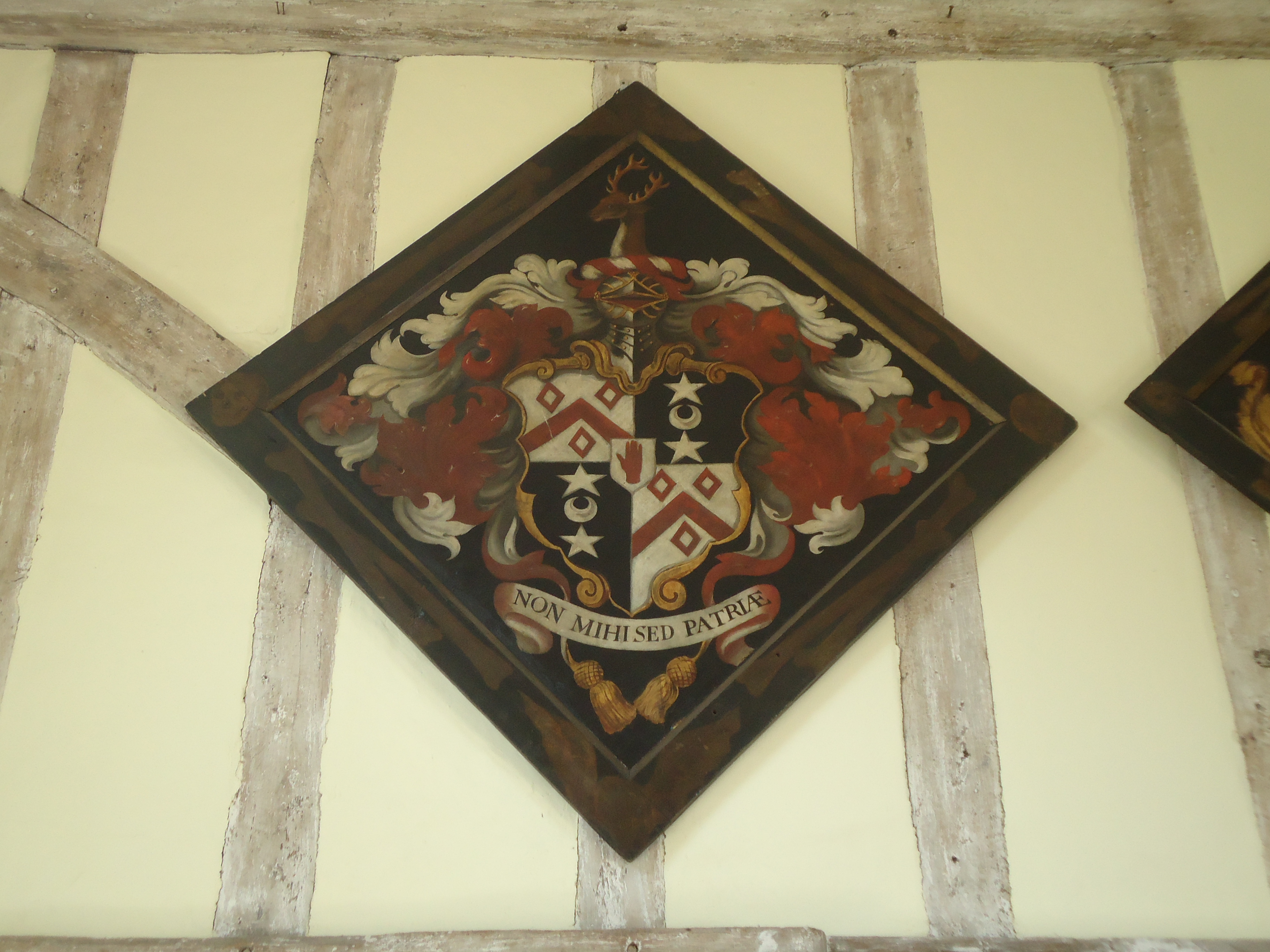
Funerary hatchment of Sir William Spring, 4th Baronet (d.1737), of Packenham, quartering the arms of Jermyn (for his heiress mother), displayed in Lavenham Guildhall

The family motto is Non mihi sed Patriae (Latin), Not for myself but for my fatherland.

Thomas Spring Esquire (died 1440) of Lavenham, the grandfather of Thomas Spring, was granted a coat-of-arms in the first reign of Henry VI, thus elevating his family into the ranks of armigerous society. As the family moved from the merchant class to the minor nobility, the coat-of-arms was employed to convey the newly bestowed rank of the family. As such it is prominently displayed, alongside the arms of the Earl of Oxford, over thirty times on Lavenham church. Examples of the Spring arms, often quartered with other local noble families, can be found across Suffolk. The coat-of-arms is now borne by Thomas Spring's descendants.

The arms is described as "Argent on a chevron, between three mascles Gules, as many cinquefoils Or." The crest is an antelope or stag, quartered in gold and silver, although the crest of an eagle has also been used.

== See also ==
- Spring baronets
- List of political families in the United Kingdom
- Lavenham
