= Thomas Spring Rice, 2nd Baron Monteagle of Brandon =

Anglo-Irish politician and landowner (1849–1926)

The Right Honourable The Lord Monteagle of Brandon KP DL
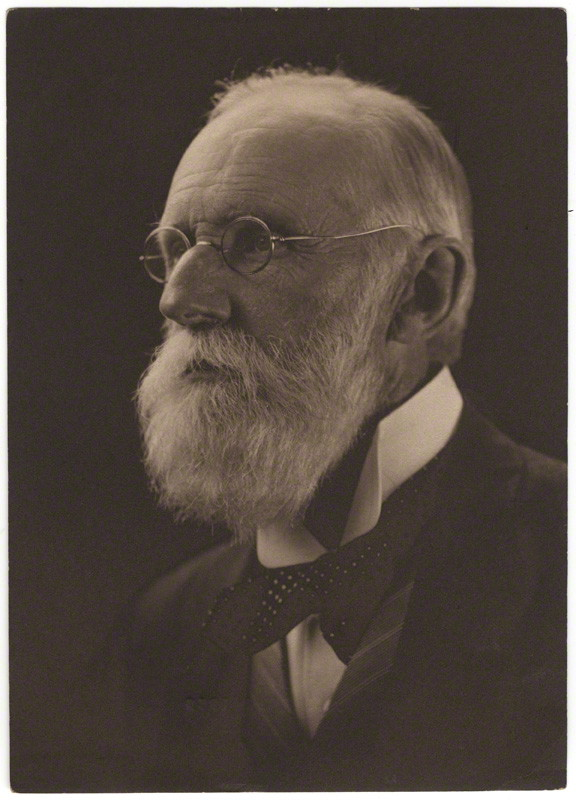

Personal details
- Born: 31 May 1849 Hither Green, London, England
- Died: 24 December 1926 Limerick, Irish Free State
- Party: Liberal Party; Liberal Unionist Party (Irish Unionist Alliance); Irish Dominion League
- Spouse: Elizabeth Butcher (m. 1875; died 1908)
- Children: 3, including Mary and Thomas
- Education: Trinity College, Cambridge

Thomas Spring Rice, 2nd Baron Monteagle of Brandon KP DL (31 May 1849 – 24 December 1926) was an Anglo-Irish politician and landowner, who helped to found the anti-partition Irish Dominion League and was a key figure in the development of Irish cooperative agriculture.

== Family and education ==
Thomas Spring Rice was the eldest son of Hon. Stephen Spring Rice (1814–1865) and his wife, Ellen Frere. He was educated at Harrow School and Trinity College, Cambridge. He became 2nd Baron Monteagle of Brandon in 1866 on the death of his grandfather, the former Chancellor of the Exchequer Thomas Spring Rice, 1st Baron Monteagle of Brandon, as his father predeceased him in 1865. Spring Rice became an active member of the House of Lords and spent much of his time at Mount Trenchard House in County Limerick, from where he managed his estates. He also owned property in London. In 1872 he attended a "General Meeting of the members and friends of the Irish Society for Women's Suffrage" in Blackrock, Dublin.

On 26 October 1875, Spring Rice married Elizabeth Butcher (d. 27 April 1908), the oldest daughter of the Most Rev. Rt. Hon. Samuel Butcher, Bishop of Meath, in County Meath. Together they had three children, who were brought up to speak fluent Irish.

- Stephen Edmond Spring Rice (1877-1900), died in London of a fever contracted while returning from Australia
- Mary Spring Rice (1880–1924), the Irish nationalist activist who died unmarried.
- Thomas Spring Rice (1883–1934), died unmarried.

His eldest son predeceased him, therefore he was succeeded in his peerage by his youngest son. After his son died without an heir in 1934, his peerage passed onto Thomas' brother, Francis Spring Rice (1852–1937). Their sister was the poet, Lucy Knox. Lord Monteagle was a cousin of Sir Cecil Spring Rice, British Ambassador to the United States from 1912 to 1918.

== Politics ==
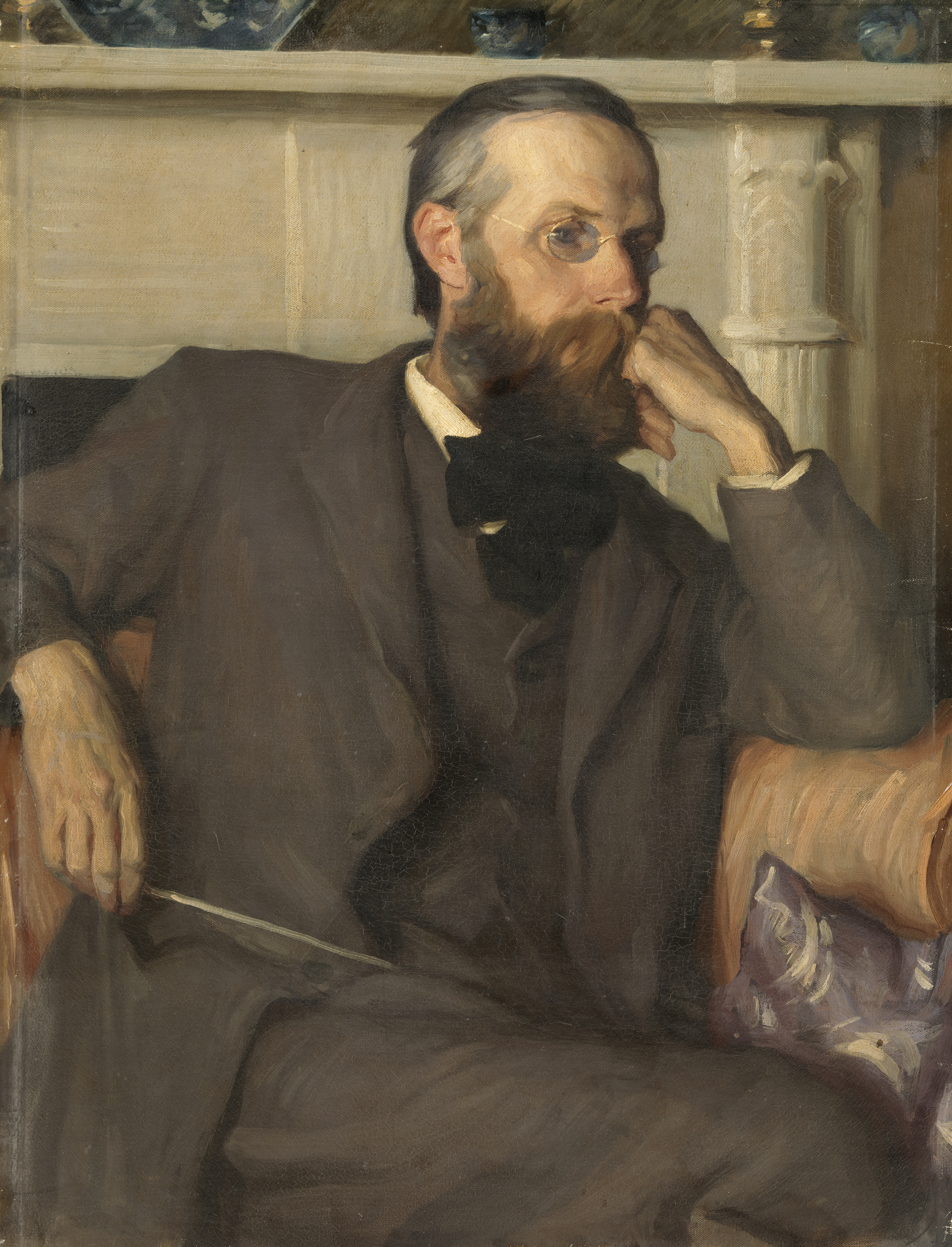
portrait by Charles Wellington Furse

Like his grandfather, Lord Monteagle was a moderate unionist when he assumed his seat in the House of Lords. He was initially a member of the Liberal Party, and in 1885 wrote a pamphlet entitled Liberal Policy in Ireland. The following year he became a Liberal Unionist out of a fear that Gladstone's 1886 Home Rule bill would lead to full independence for Ireland, and the dissolution of the United Kingdom. As a consequence, Lord Monteagle sat with the peers of the Irish Unionist Alliance and he became a leading figure among moderate Southern Unionists. As a resident of Ireland he witnessed the deterioration of the political situation during the 1890s. He gradually became of the opinion that unionists had to recognise that in order to protect the Union, a compromising and workable agreement would need to be reached with Irish nationalists. In 1911, he was a founding member, and later president, of the Proportional Representation Society of Ireland, believing that proportional representation would help to prevent conflict between unionists and nationalists in a self-governing Ireland. In 1917, he helped to arrange the Irish Convention, using his personal connections to ensure that the interests of Sinn Féin were represented after the party leadership refused to attend. The same year, he publicly identified himself as a moderate who still believed in the principle of Union but recognised that it was not working for the majority of Irishmen. He was anxious that Ireland should not be divided and in 1919 he left the fractured Unionist Alliance to join the Irish Dominion League. The League was under the leadership of his close friend and cooperative colleague, Sir Horace Plunkett. He subsequently became chairman of the London branch of the League, and attempted to encourage David Lloyd George's government to grant dominion status to a united Ireland in line with the League's views. In June 1920 he arranged meetings between representatives of the British government and the nationalist George Gavan Duffy. A month later he proposed the Dominion of Ireland Bill in the House of Lords, at the same time as the government's Government of Ireland Bill was being debated in the British parliament. His bill would have granted extensive home rule to a united Ireland, with responsibility over all domestic matters as a dominion within the empire. Monteagle argued that the foreign affairs and defence of Ireland should, however, remain the responsibility of the Westminster government. Opposed by both the Conservative Earl of Dunraven, who argued for a federal union through devolution, and Liberal peers supporting the government's own bill, Monteagle's bill was defeated at second reading on 1 July 1920, by 28 votes for to 41 votes against.

He caused indignation in the unionist community in Ireland when, in a February 1920 letter to The Times, he called for an end to the deportation and internment without trial of recently elected Sinn Féin politicians.

== Honours and appointments ==
Lord Monteagle was appointed a Knight of the Order of St Patrick on 9 February 1885; his armorial banner hangs in St Patrick's Hall, Dublin Castle alongside those of other knights. He served as the Deputy Lieutenant for the County of Limerick. He was a founder of the Irish Agricultural Organisation Society alongside Plunkett, succeeding him as president of the society, and was a proponent of agricultural cooperative economics. He was president of the Statistical and Social Inquiry Society of Ireland between 1882 and 1884.

Coat of arms of Thomas Spring Rice, 2nd Baron Monteagle of Brandon
Crest A leopard’s face Gules ducally crowned Or. Escutcheon Quarterly 1st & 4th per pale indented Argent and Gules (Rice) 2nd Azure a lion rampant Or (Meredyth) 3rd Argent on a chevron between three mascles Gules as many cinquefoils Argent (Spring). Motto Fides Non Timet

== Ancestry ==
Ancestors of Thomas Spring Rice, 2nd Baron Monteagle of Brandon

16. James Rice
8. Stephen Rice
17. Mary Trelawny
4. Thomas Spring Rice, 1st Baron Monteagle of Brandon
18. Thomas Spring of Castlemaine
9. Catherine Spring
2. Hon. Stephen Spring Rice
20. William Pery, 1st Baron Glentworth
10. Edmund Pery, 1st Earl of Limerick
21. Jane Walcott
5. Lady Theodosia Pery
22. Henry Ormsby
11. Mary Ormsby
23. Mary Hartstonge
1. Thomas Spring Rice, 2nd Baron Monteagle of Brandon
24. Sheppard Frere
12. John Frere
6. William Frere
13. Jane Frere
3. Ellen Frere
28. Thornhagh Gurdon
14. Brampton Gurdon Dillingham
29. Sarah Dillingham
7. Mary Gurdon Dillingham
30. Samuel Howard
15. Mary Howard
31. Elizabeth de Vere

Peerage of the United Kingdom
Preceded by Thomas Spring Rice	Baron Monteagle of Brandon; 1866–1926	Succeeded by Thomas Spring Rice
