= Thomas Spring Rice, 3rd Baron Monteagle of Brandon =

British diplomat and Anglo-Irish peer

The Right Honourable The Lord Monteagle of Brandon CMG MVO
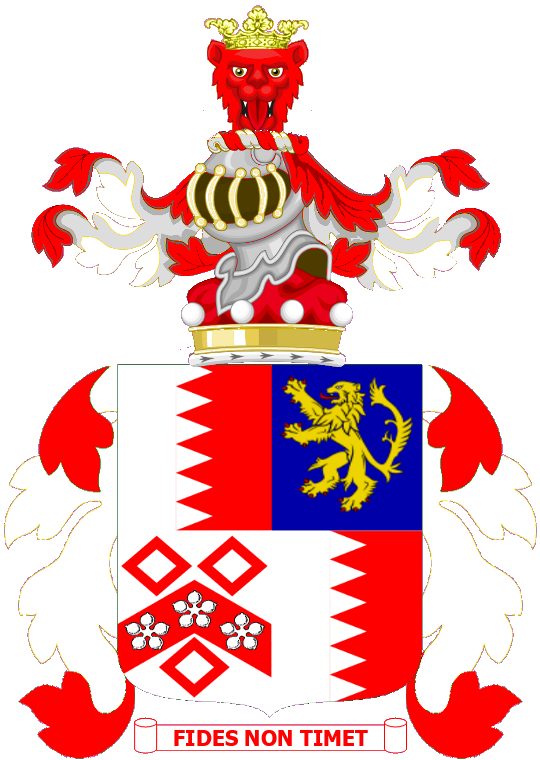

Personal details
- Born: 3 November 1883 County Meath, United Kingdom of Great Britain and Ireland
- Died: 11 October 1934 (aged 50) London, United Kingdom
- Party: Liberal Party
- Education: Balliol College, Oxford
- Occupation: Diplomat

Thomas Aubrey Spring Rice, 3rd Baron Monteagle of Brandon CMG MVO (3 November 1883 – 11 October 1934) was an Anglo-Irish peer and British diplomat.

== Early life ==
Spring Rice was born in County Meath, the youngest son of Thomas Spring Rice, 2nd Baron Monteagle of Brandon and Elizabeth Butcher. He was brought up on the family estate of Mount Trenchard House, and educated at Eton College and Balliol College, Oxford.

== Diplomatic career ==
He entered His Majesty's Diplomatic Service in 1907. He held appointments in St Petersburg (1908-1910) and Washington DC (1910-1919), where he served alongside his relation, Sir Cecil Spring Rice, who was ambassador.

He later served in Paris and Brussels between 1920 and 1921, before holding positions in the Foreign Office between 1924 and 1930. Spring Rice was invested as a Commander of the Order of St Michael and St George and a Member of the Royal Victorian Order. He was also made an Officer of the Belgian Order of Leopold.

== Irish nationalism ==
Spring Rice was sympathetic to the Irish Home Rule movement and, although he maintained the public façade of being a unionist, he was close to many people involved in nationalist politics. Alongside his father, he helped to arrange the Irish Convention in 1917, using his personal connections to ensure that the interests of Sinn Féin were represented after the party leadership refused to attend. His sister was the Irish nationalist activist, Mary Spring Rice.

== Personal life ==
He became Baron Monteagle of Brandon in 1926 on the death of his father, following the premature death of his older brother, Stephen. He sat as a Liberal in the House of Lords. Spring Rice did not marry, and was succeeded in the title by his uncle, Francis.

Coat of arms of Thomas Spring Rice, 3rd Baron Monteagle of Brandon

Crest
A leopard's face Gules ducally crowned Or.
Escutcheon
Quarterly 1st & 4th per pale indented Argent and Gules (Rice) 2nd Azure a lion rampant Or (Meredyth) 3rd Argent on a chevron between three mascles Gules as many cinquefoils Argent.
Motto
Fides Non Timet

Peerage of the United Kingdom
Preceded by Thomas Spring Rice	Baron Monteagle of Brandon; 1926–1934	Succeeded by Francis Spring Rice
