= Stephen Rice (judge) =

Irish judge (1637–1715)

The Right Honourable Sir Stephen Rice

Chief Baron of the Irish Exchequer
- In office 1687–1690
- Monarch: James II
- Preceded by: Henry Hene
- Succeeded by: John Hely

Personal details
- Born: 1637 Dingle, County Kerry, Ireland
- Died: 1715 (aged 77–78) Dublin, Ireland
- Spouse: Mary Fitzgerald

Sir Stephen Rice (1637–1715) was an Irish lawyer and judge, who served as Chief Baron of the Exchequer in Ireland under James II. He was noted for his close political association with Richard Talbot, 1st Earl of Tyrconnell and for his legal rulings in support of Catholic land rights in Ireland during his brief tenure.

== Early life ==
Rice was born in Dingle, County Kerry in 1637. According to W.N. Osborough he was "probably" the eldest son of Edward Rice of Dingle, and Christian, daughter of Peter Nagle; albeit some older references give his parents as James Rice MP and Phyllis Fanning, part of an Old English Roman Catholic family with large estates in Munster.

Despite his Catholicism, in 1671 Rice entered the Middle Temple to train in law, a profession which at the time largely excluded Catholics. He became a member of King's Inns in 1674. By 1678 he had established a private practice of some size and counted many Catholic and Protestant landowners, such as Lord Bourke and Sir Donough O'Brien, 1st Baronet, among his clients. Throughout the 1680s he acted as legal counsel for the Irish affairs of Sir Joseph Williamson, and was known at the Irish Bar as the leading counsel in revenue matters.

== Judge under James II ==
Following the accession of James II in 1685, Catholic lawyers were gradually appointed to the Irish bench, with an accompanying dispensation from taking the Oath of Supremacy. In April 1686 James II appointed Rice Baron of the Exchequer, by the peremptory dismissal of Sir Standish Hartstonge, 1st Baronet. Rice was made a privy councillor in May along with Richard Talbot, 1st Earl of Tyrconnell, Thomas Nugent, Sir Richard Nagle, Justin MacCarthy, and Richard Hamilton. He first sat as a judge at the beginning of June and afterwards went to the Leinster circuit.

The Court of Exchequer (Ireland) was the only Irish court from which a writ of error did not lie in England; as a result, it was crowded with suitors. Rice supported the resolve of Tyrconnell and his supporters to change the situation under the Act of Settlement 1662. He opposed the suggestion of a commission of grace, by which money might be raised and the position of existing landowners might at the same time be respected. In August 1686, Rice said 'a commission would only serve to confirm those estates which ought not to be confirmed.' He declined to say what should be done to those whose titles were doubtful and declared that nothing could be done without a parliament. In November, Rice took steps to prevent the Court of Common Pleas (Ireland), where John Keating presided, from interfering in disputes between revenue officers and merchants. In April 1687 he was made Chief Baron, displacing Henry Hene, and was knighted.

After Tyrconnell succeeded Henry Hyde, 2nd Earl of Clarendon in the government (February 1687), Protestants were dismissed from civil and military employment. The charters of nearly all the corporations, about one hundred in number, were brought into the exchequer by writs of quo warranto and declared void. The next step was the forfeiture of leases made by corporations. Rice declared that in this and other matters the Protestants should have the strict letter of the law. He was one of the privy councillors who on 8 March 1686–7 signed Tyrconnell's proclamation promising that "His Majesty's subjects of whatever persuasion should be protected in their just rights and properties due to them by law." The Corporation of Dublin was required to plead the validity of its charter at short notice, and this led to a clerical error in the pleadings. The Chief Baron refused leave to amend the irregularity, and declared the charter forfeited. Protestant mayors and sheriffs were generally expelled, and at Limerick Rice refused to hold the assizes until Tyrconnell's nominees were admitted. Rice himself became one of the forty-two burgesses of the city under James's new charter.

In August 1687, Rice was with Tyrconnell and Nagle at Chester, where he dined with the bishop Thomas Cartwright, and conferred with the king on a modification of the restoration land settlement. Rice, accompanied by Chief Justice Nugent, was sent to London early in 1688 to procure James's consent to Irish legislation. Although James II's response to the proposed bills is not known, they were strongly opposed by the members of the Privy Council of England. The two Irish judges were mocked by an angry London mob brandishing potatoes on sticks and shouting 'make way for the Irish ambassadors'. On 25 April, Clarendon noted in his diary that the two Irish judges that day began their homeward journey 'with very little satisfaction, for I am told the king did not approve the proposals they brought him for calling a parliament.'

== After the Glorious Revolution ==
After James II's flight from England during the Glorious Revolution of 1688, Tyrconnell sent Rice to France with William Stewart, 1st Viscount Mountjoy, whom he wished to be rid of, and they left Dublin on 10 January 1689. Mountjoy's instructions were to say that any attempt on Ireland would be hopeless, but he was sent to the Bastille as soon as he reached Paris. Rice urged an immediate invasion, and returned to Ireland with James in the following March. He became a commissioner of the Jacobite treasury, and was in Limerick during the first siege of the town in 1690. After William III's repulse there in August 1690, he went again to France, and returned with Tyrconnell. They brought some money, and landed at Galway in January 1691.

However, following the Battle of the Boyne in July 1690, it had become clear that the Jacobite cause was ruined. A patent which would have made Rice a baron in the Jacobite peerage as Lord Monteagle was found in Dublin, waiting to be signed by the now-exiled James II. Following the end of the war, The Crown adjudged Rice to be within the Articles of Limerick, and he remained in Ireland in possession of his estate. He does not seem to have returned to his practice as a barrister, but on 22 February 1703 he appeared without a gown at the bar of the Irish House of Commons, and on the 28 at that of the Lords, to argue against the Act to prevent the further growth of popery, and in favour of the articles of Limerick. He was accompanied by Sir Toby Butler, James's Solicitor General for Ireland, who made a memorable speech denouncing the Popery Act as being "against the laws of God and man".

Rice died on 16 February 1715, aged 78.

== Family ==
Rice married Mary, the daughter of Thomas Fitzgerald of County Limerick, and had several children. His eldest son, Edward, converted from Catholicism to the Anglican Church of Ireland, in order to save his estate from passing in gavelkind. Edward's nephew, Stephen, married a daughter of the Spring family, and their eldest son, Thomas Spring Rice, became Baron Monteagle of Brandon, the title that James II had intended to confer upon Rice before his deposing.

Legal offices
| Preceded by Henry Hene | Lord Chief Baron of the Irish Exchequer; 1687–1690 | Succeeded by John Hely |
