= Charles Spring Rice, 5th Baron Monteagle of Brandon =

Anglo-Irish peer (1887–1946)

Charles Spring Rice, 5th Baron Monteagle of Brandon (28 January 1887 – 9 December 1946) was an Anglo-Irish peer.

Spring Rice was the son of Francis Spring Rice, 4th Baron Monteagle of Brandon, by his first wife, Elizabeth Ann FitzGerald. He was educated at Harrow School and Trinity College, Cambridge. Spring Rice served as an officer in the Royal Army Service Corps during the First World War, leaving the army as a captain in 1919. He inherited his barony following the death of his father in 1937, when he took his seat as a Conservative in the House of Lords. He lived at Mount Trenchard House.

He married Emilie Frances de Kosenko, an American heiress, on 14 April 1925 and they had three children. He was succeeded by his eldest son, Gerald.

Coat of arms of Charles Spring Rice, 5th Baron Monteagle of Brandon
Crest A leopard’s face Gules ducally crowned Or. Escutcheon Quarterly 1st & 4th per pale indented Argent and Gules (Rice) 2nd Azure a lion rampant Or (Meredyth) 3rd Argent on a chevron between three mascles Gules as many cinquefoils Argent. Motto Fides Non Timet

Peerage of the United Kingdom
Preceded by Francis Spring Rice	Baron Monteagle of Brandon; 1937–1946	Succeeded by Gerald Spring Rice
