= Irish Agricultural Organisation Society =

Cooperative promoter, credit provider

- Type: Agricultural cooperative Producer cooperative
- Industry: Agriculture, home industry
- Founded: 1894
- Successor: Irish Co-operative Organisation Society
- Headquarters: 84 Merrion Square, Dublin, United Kingdom of Great Britain and Ireland
- Area served: Ireland
- Key people: Sir Horace Plunkett (Founder); Lord Monteagle (President); Thomas A. Finlay (Vice-President); Robert A. Anderson (Secretary); George William Russell (Assistant Secretary); PJ Hannon (Assistant Secretary)
- Services: Farming advice, business expertise and financial assistance
- Members: Over 100,000 in 1914

The Irish Agricultural Organisation Society (IAOS) was an agricultural association in Ireland which advocated, and helped to organise, agricultural cooperativism, including mutual credit facilities. From its establishment by Sir Horace Plunkett in 1894, it quickly became an important element of the Irish economy and laid the foundations of the successful Irish dairy industry.

Although officially apolitical, the IAOS became associated with the Irish Home Rule movement and Irish nationalist activity from the early 20th century. It was later reorganised, and renamed as the Irish Co-operative Organisation Society Limited, a body which continues to operate in Ireland.

== Foundation ==
The Irish Agricultural Organisation Society (IAOS) was founded in 1894 by Sir Horace Plunkett, an Anglo-Irish politician with a keen interest in agriculture and rural affairs. He had established a cooperative on his family estate at Dunsany as early as 1878. Other key figures involved in setting up the IAOS included Plunkett's personal friends Thomas A. Finlay and Thomas Spring Rice, 2nd Baron Monteagle of Brandon, whose Mount Trenchard House home provided an early venue for meetings. Plunkett and the other founders were motivated by a desire to "regenerate" Irish farmers materially and morally. Plunkett had witnessed at first-hand the success of agricultural cooperatives in the United States of America, and desired to establish a more productive business-like approach to farming in Ireland, taking account of Scandinavian models of co-operation. In addition, he saw co-operativism as an answer to the growing conflict between Roman Catholic and Protestant rural communities. As Plunkett recalled in his 1908 pamphlet The Rural Life Problem of the United States:

Our message to Irish farmers was that they must imitate the methods of their Continental competitors, who were defeating them in their own markets simply by superior organisation. After five years of individual propagandism, the Irish Agricultural Organisation Society was formed in 1894 to meet the demand for instruction as to the formation and the working of cooperative societies, a demand to which it was beyond the means of the few pioneers to respond.

The new rural enterprises were administered by a democratically elected committee upon which "the best businessmen in the community" sat, whether "landlord or tenant, Protestant or Roman Catholic, Unionist or Nationalist". IAOS activists believed that the application of cooperative principles offered a solution to problems of rural life and addressed social anxieties prevalent in the Irish countryside.

The agricultural cooperative was a relatively new idea to Ireland, but by 1894 there were already numerous examples of cooperatives operating, especially in south-west Ireland. The first creamery co-op had been established in Dromcolliher in 1889, while Plunkett was involved in setting up the second in Ballyhahill in 1891. The IAOS sought to provide an overarching organisational structure for these small cooperatives, providing farming advice, business expertise and financial assistance when necessary. The policies of the IAOS were guided by a committee of twenty-four members, one-half of whom were elected by individual subscribers and the other half by the affiliated societies.

== Activity ==
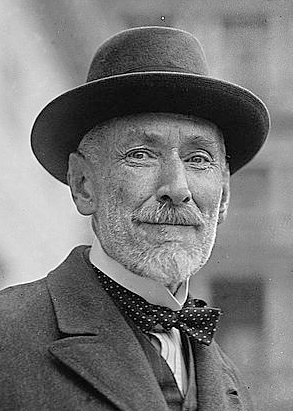
The Irish Agricultural Organisation Society was founded by Sir Horace Plunkett in 1894

The IAOS was dependent on the subscription fees of its member cooperatives and donations from philanthropic individuals. It quickly gained support across Ireland, and the number of cooperative organisations flourished. The Department of Agriculture and Technical Instruction (DATI), a government department also founded by Plunkett, in 1899, provided assistance to the movement until the DATI was taken over Sir Thomas Russell, 1st Baronet.

The success of the movement was outlined as follows by Plunkett in his book Ireland in the New Century:

By the autumn of this year (1903) considerably over eight hundred societies had been established, and the number is ever growing; of these 360 were dairy, and 140 agricultural societies, nearly 200 agricultural banks, 50 home industries societies, 40 poultry societies, while there were 40 others with miscellaneous objects. The membership may be estimated—I am writing towards the end of the Society's statistical year—at about 80,000, representing some 400,000 persons. The combined trade turnover of these societies during the present year will reach approximately £2,000,000, a figure the meaning of which can only be appreciated when it is remembered that the great majority of the associated farmers are in so small a way of business that in England they would hardly be classed as farmers at all.

By 1908, there were 881 cooperatives in Ireland with an annual turnover of £3.3 million. These cooperatives represented 85,939 individual members, mostly farmers. By 1910, the IAOS had organised over three hundred agricultural banks, which provided capital to farmers and acted as depositories for the joint credit and profit of the cooperatives. While chiefly concerning itself with agricultural activity, it also aided the Irish flax industry and various other home industry societies. The society built or purchased meeting halls in many rural Irish communities to act as focal points for cooperative activity. By 1914, the society had over 100,000 members.

In 1908 donors to the society bought a large house in central Dublin, 84 Merrion Square, for Plunkett, and this became the headquarters of the IAOS, being named 'The Plunkett House'. It also housed the headquarters of the Irish Homestead, a weekly journal which publicised the work and practice of the society. In 1907, the IAOS employed eight organisers, seven men and one woman, each allocated a specific region. It relied upon this small number of staff to communicate the official views of the movement to the grassroots membership. The IAOS attracted numerous notable employees and members, including Thomas Westropp Bennett, George William Russell ("AE"), Denis O'Donnell, Henry A. Wallace and Francis O'Brien, father of Conor Cruise O'Brien. With the advice and financial support of IAOS, the Society of United Irishwomen was formed in 1910. In 1935, the Society of the United Irishwomen changed its name to the Irish Countrywomen's Association (ICA).

Several of the largest businesses in Ireland, including Aryzta, Glanbia and Kerry Group, trace their roots to the cooperative farming activity initiated and supported by the Irish Agricultural Organisation Society. Today, the society continues as the Irish Co-operative Organisation Society, which serves and promotes commercial co-operative businesses and enterprise across multiple sections of the Irish economy.

=== Conflict with the British movement ===
The IAOS advocated the move from consumer co-operation to the promotion of creameries, leading to conflict with the British Co-operative Union, which had helped to finance some of the early propagandising in Ireland. Some members felt that Plunkett and his followers were neglecting consumer cooperation. Relations between British and Irish co-operators remained strained, reaching breaking point in 1895 when the Manchester-based Co-operative Wholesale Society (CWS) established creameries in Ireland in competition with Irish co-operatives. The CWS, as the central wholesaling body of the British retail co-operative movement, already had economic interests in Ireland, including butter-buying agencies, and the move to set up creameries seemed a logical extension of its own business activities. Charges of imperialism were levelled at the Wholesale Society by the Irish Agricultural Organisation Society. The CWS was a large and wealthy organisation which posed a serious threat to the Irish movement. It could buy up creameries and equip and run them at no expense to the local milk-producing farmers, though the IAOS feared that the longer-term effect would be a loss of control and economic dependency. Particularly worrying for Irish co-operators were indications that some farmers were prepared to take the short-term view, preferring to entrust the development of the milk-processing industry to outside interests. The CWS also had political links to the Liberal Party through their joint commitment to free trade, while the IAOS was concerned with protecting Irish farmers against the effects of free trade.

== Political links ==
=== Irish Dominion League ===
The founders of the Irish Agricultural Organisation Society were largely moderate unionists with landholdings in Ireland. Plunkett sat as a Unionist MP in the House of Commons while Lord Monteagle was initially a Liberal Unionist member of the House of Lords. Together with other members of the society, such as George William Russell and W. B. Yeats, Plunkett and Lord Monteagle came to believe that Home Rule was the only way to keep Ireland united, which was one of the main motivations behind the founding of the IAOS. As such, the leadership of the IAOS was closely involved in the political activities of the Irish Dominion League. This political group sought to prevent the partition of Ireland, but also believed that the Irish should organise themselves to take control of their domestic policy, a principle very much inline with the IAOS's beliefs.

=== Irish nationalism ===
The IAOS became linked to Irish nationalist activity during the early twentieth century. The society's meeting halls provided venues for rural nationalists to meet and discuss politics, while the philosophy of self-help and unity promoted by the society appealed to many in the nationalist cause. The society had always focused on the social, as well as the economic, benefits of cooperative principles, and as such IAOS associations came to indirectly mould notions of Irish nationhood and identity. The co-operative movement offered a unique analysis of the Irish Question in stark contrast to the political debate. It re-framed the 'Irish Question' as social and economic in nature and identified the condition of rural life as the integral component. Its emphasis on rural reform as the most urgent priority contrasted with the priorities of the British government, which was largely concerned with constitutional affairs. The rural communities which formed the basis of IAOS membership were also where the Gaelic revival took hold earliest. In 1902, the then-President of the IAOS, Lord Monteagle, stated in his annual report that Conradh na Gaeilge meetings and Irish Republican Brotherhood events were increasingly taking place in cooperative halls. In County Kerry, Lord Monteagle's daughter, Mary Spring Rice, regularly used meetings of the local IAOS to promote nationalist politics. Nationalist leaders were keen to make the connection between the IAOS's mission of "saving Irish country life" and the goals of Irish nationalism.

== See also ==
- Irish Co-operative Organisation Society
- Sir Horace Plunkett – Irish agricultural reformer and politician (1854–1932)
