= Thomas Spring Rice, 1st Baron Monteagle of Brandon =

British politician

The Right Honourable The Lord Monteagle of Brandon PC FRS FGS
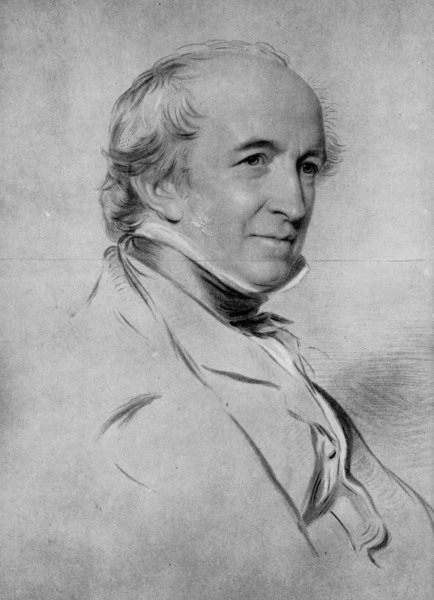
- Portrait by George Richmond

Chancellor of the Exchequer
- In office 18 April 1835 – 26 August 1839
- Monarchs: William IV; Victoria
- Prime Minister: The Viscount Melbourne
- Preceded by: Sir Robert Peel, Bt
- Succeeded by: Francis Baring

Secretary of State for War and the Colonies
- In office 5 June 1834 – 14 November 1834
- Monarch: William IV
- Prime Minister: The Viscount Melbourne
- Preceded by: Edward Smith-Stanley
- Succeeded by: The Duke of Wellington

Comptroller General of the Exchequer
- In office 18 April 1835 – 7 February 1866
- Monarchs: William IV; Victoria
- Preceded by: Sir John Newport, Bt.
- Succeeded by: Office abolished

Personal details
- Born: 8 February 1790
- Died: 7 February 1866 (aged 75)
- Party: Whigs
- Spouse(s): (1) Lady Theodosia Pery (died 1839) (2) Marianne Marshall
- Education: Trinity College, Cambridge

Thomas Spring Rice, 1st Baron Monteagle of Brandon, PC, FRS, FGS (8 February 1790 – 7 February 1866) was a British Whig politician, who served as Chancellor of the Exchequer from 1835 to 1839.

== Background ==
Spring Rice was born into a notable Anglo-Irish family, which owned large estates in Munster. He was one of the three children of Stephen Edward Rice (died 1831), of Mount Trenchard House, and Catherine Spring, daughter and heiress of Thomas Spring of Ballycrispin and Castlemaine, County Kerry, a descendant of the Suffolk Spring family. He was a great grandson of Sir Stephen Rice (1637–1715), Chief Baron of the Irish Exchequer and a leading Jacobite, and Sir Maurice FitzGerald, 14th Knight of Kerry. His only married sister, Mary, was the mother of the Catholic converts Aubrey Thomas de Vere, poet, and the Liberal Member of Parliament, Sir Stephen de Vere, 4th Baronet. Spring Rice's grandfather, Edward, had converted the family from Roman Catholicism to the Anglican Church of Ireland, to save his estate from passing in gavelkind.

Spring Rice was educated at Trinity College, Cambridge, and later studied law at Lincoln's Inn, but was not called to the Bar. His family was politically well-connected, both in Ireland and Great Britain, and he was encouraged to stand for Parliament by his father-in-law, Lord Limerick.

== Political career ==
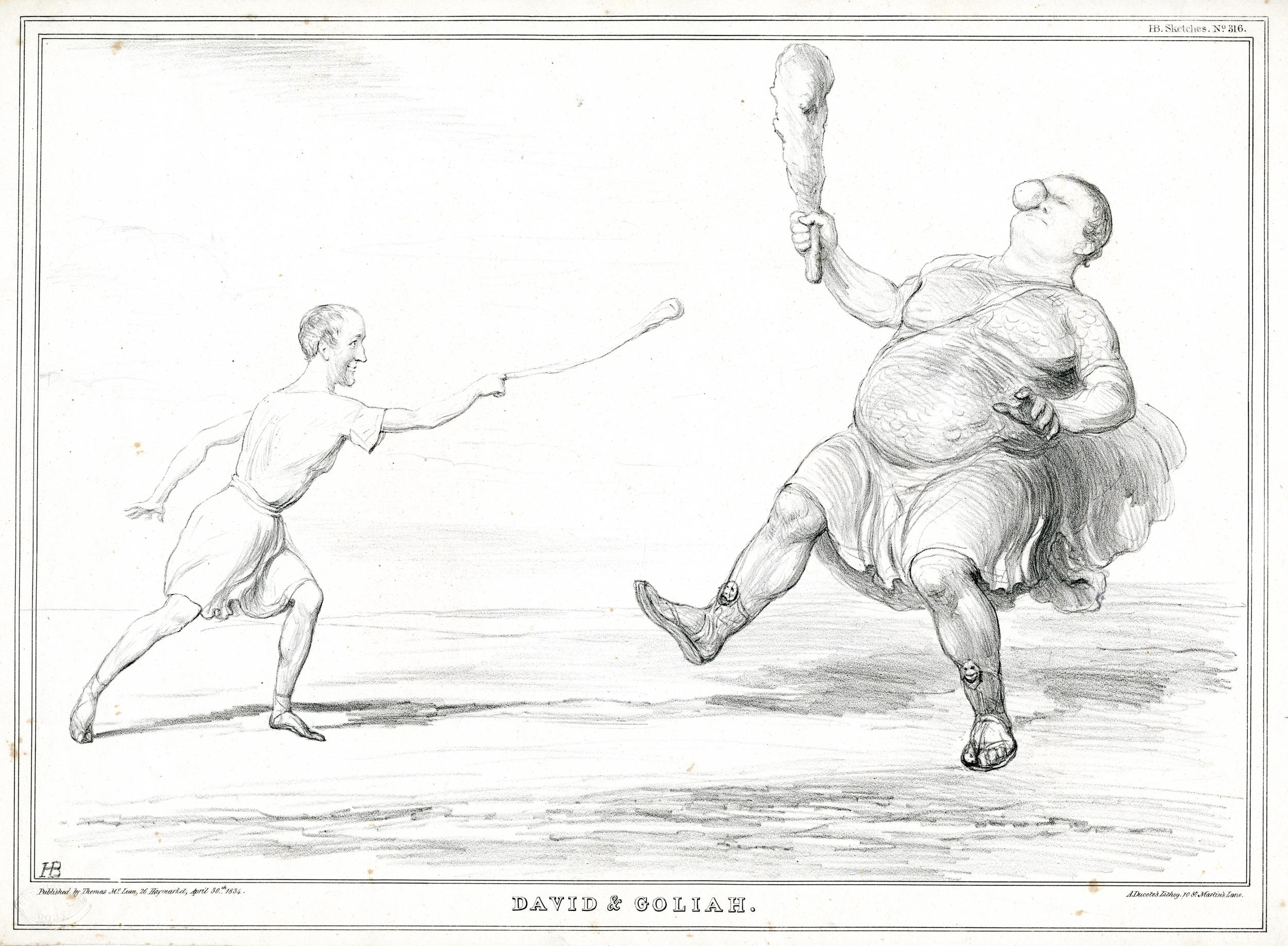
A satirical depiction of Spring Rice (left) and Daniel O'Connell (right) as David and Goliath. Spring Rice led the parliamentary opposition to O'Connell's 1834 attempt to repeal the Acts of Union

Spring Rice first stood for election in Limerick City in 1818 but was defeated by the Tory incumbent, John Vereker, by 300 votes. He won the seat in 1820 and entered the House of Commons. He positioned himself as a moderate unionist reformer who opposed the radical nationalist politics of Daniel O'Connell, and became known for his expertise on Irish and economic affairs. In 1824 he led the committee which established the Ordnance Survey in Ireland.

Spring Rice's fluent debating style in the Commons brought him to the attention of leading Whigs and he came under the patronage of the Marquess of Lansdowne. As a result, Spring Rice was made Under-Secretary of State for the Home Department under George Canning and Lord Goderich in 1827, with responsibility for Irish affairs. This required Spring Rice to accept deferral of Catholic Emancipation, a policy which he strongly supported. Spring Rice then served as joint Secretary to the Treasury from 1830 to 1834 under Lord Grey. Following the Reform Act 1832, he was elected to represent Cambridge from 1832 to 1839.

In June 1834, Grey appointed Spring Rice Secretary of State for War and the Colonies, with a seat in the cabinet, a post he retained when Lord Melbourne became Prime Minister in July. A strong and vocal unionist throughout his life, Spring Rice led the Parliamentary opposition to Daniel O'Connell's 1834 attempt to repeal the Acts of Union 1800.

In a six-hour speech in the House of Commons on 23 April 1834, he suggested that Ireland should be renamed 'West Britain'. In the Commons, he championed causes such as the worldwide abolition of slavery and the introduction of state-supported education. The Whig government fell in November 1834, after which Spring Rice attempted to be elected Speaker of the House of Commons in early 1835.

When the Whigs returned to power under Melbourne in April 1835, Spring Rice was made Chancellor of the Exchequer. As Chancellor, Spring Rice had to deal with crop failures, a depression and rebellion in North America, all of which created large deficits and put considerable strain on the government. His Church Rate Bill of 1837 was quickly abandoned and his attempt to revise the charter of the Bank of Ireland ended in humiliation. Spring Rice, unhappy as Chancellor, again tried to be elected as Speaker, but failed. He was a dogmatic figure, described by Lord Melbourne as "too much given to details and possessed of no broad views".

Upon his departure from office in 1839, Spring Rice had become a scapegoat for the government's many problems. That same year he was raised to the peerage as Baron Monteagle of Brandon, in the County of Kerry, a title intended earlier for his ancestor, Sir Stephen Rice. Lord Monteagle of Brandon was also Comptroller General of the Exchequer from 1835 to 1865, despite Lord Howick's initial opposition to the maintenance of the office. Monteagle differed from the government regarding the exchequer control over the treasury, and the abolition of the old exchequer was already determined upon when he died.

From 1839, he largely retired from public life, although he occasionally spoke in the House of Lords on matters generally relating to government finance and Ireland. He vehemently opposed Lord John Russell's policy regarding the Irish famine, giving a speech in the Lords in which he said the government had "degraded our people, and you, English, now shrink from your responsibilities."

== Outside Parliament ==
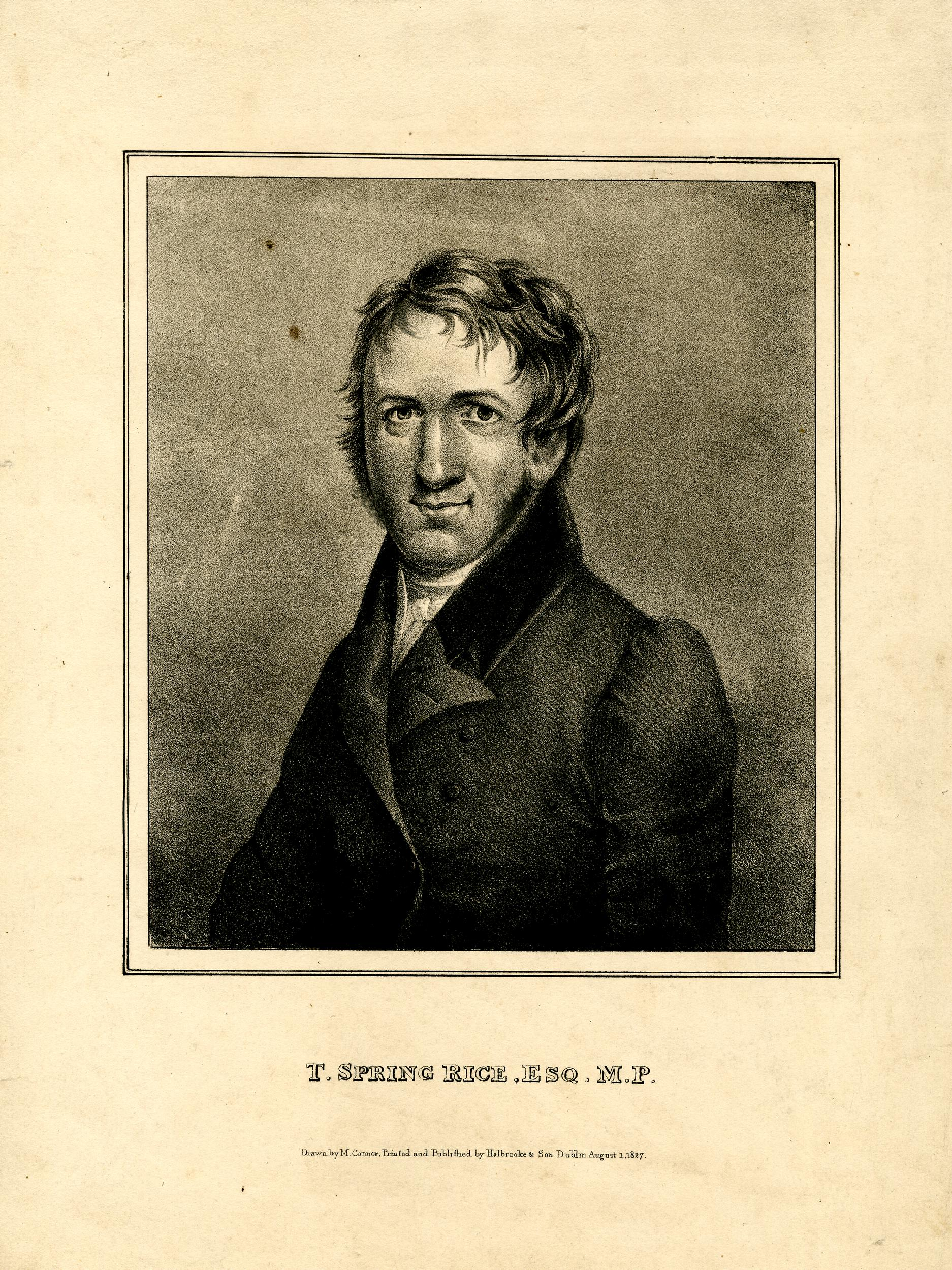
Spring Rice as the MP for Limerick in an 1827 lithograph

In addition to his political career, Spring Rice was a commissioner of the state paper office, a trustee of the National Gallery and a member of the senate of the University of London and of the Queen's University of Ireland. Between 1845 and 1847, he was President of the Royal Statistical Society. In addition, he was a Fellow of the Royal Society and a Fellow of the Geological Society. In May 1832 he became a member of James Mill's Political Economy Club.

Spring Rice was well regarded in Limerick, where he was seen as a compassionate landlord and a good politician. An advocate of traditional Whiggism, he strongly believed in ensuring society was protected from conflict between the upper and lower classes. Although a pious Anglican, his support for Catholic emancipation won him the favour of many Irishmen, most of whom were Roman Catholic. He led the campaign for better county government in Ireland at a time when many Irish nationalists were indifferent to the cause.

During the Great Famine of the 1840s, Spring Rice responded to the plight of his tenants with benevolence. The ameliorative measures he implemented on his estates almost bankrupted the family and only the dowry from his second marriage saved his financial situation. A monument in honour of him still stands in the People's Park in Limerick.

Even so, Spring Rice's reputation in Ireland is not entirely favourable. In a book regarding assisted emigration from Ireland (a process in which a landlord paid for their tenants' passage to the United States or Australia), writer Gerard Moran has suggested that Spring Rice was engaged in the practice. In 1838, he is recorded as having 'helped' a boat load of his tenants depart for North America, thereby allowing himself the use of their land. However, Spring Rice is also recorded as having been in support of state-assisted emigration across the British Isles, suggesting that Moran's interpretation of Spring Rice's actions is not fully accurate.

Mount Monteagle in Antarctica and Monteagle County in New South Wales were named in honour of Spring Rice.

== Family ==
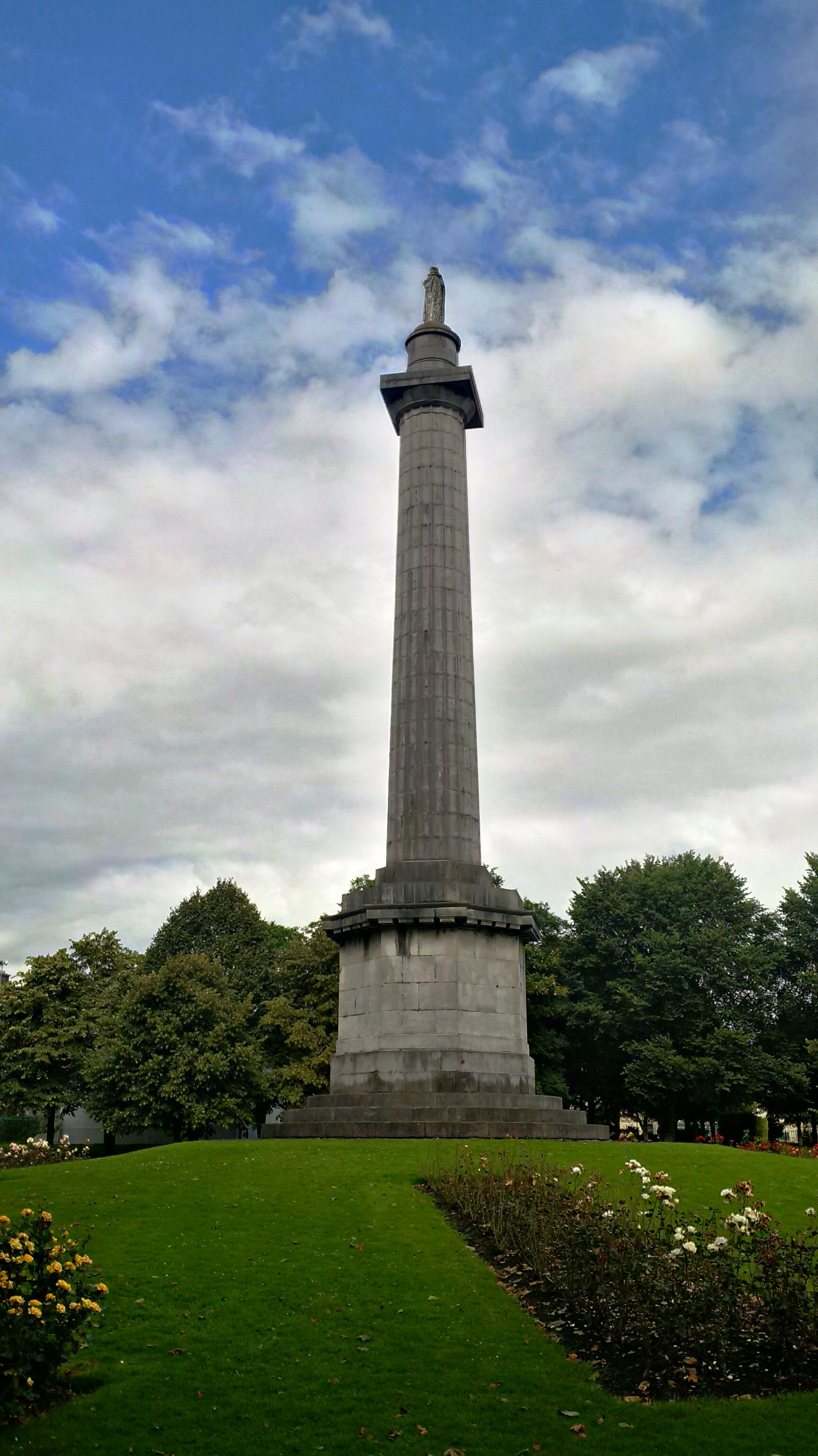
The Spring Rice monument in Limerick, Ireland.

Lord Monteagle of Brandon was married twice. He married firstly Lady Theodosia Pery, daughter of Edmund Pery, 1st Earl of Limerick, in 1811. He was just 21 at the time, and this marriage prematurely ended his university career. It produced five sons and three daughters:

- Hon. Theodosia Alicia Ellen Frances Charlotte Spring Rice (died 2 January 1891), married Sir Henry Taylor in 1839.
- Hon. Mary Alicia Pery Spring Rice (died 11 May 1875), served as a Maid of Honour to Queen Victoria between 1837 and 1841. Married James Marshall in 1841.
- Hon. Catherine Anne Lucy Spring Rice (died 23 July 1853), married Henry Marshall in 1837.
- Hon. Stephen Edmund Spring Rice (31 Aug 1814 – 9 May 1865), married Ellen Frere in 1839. He was High Sheriff of County Limerick in 1837.
- Hon. Charles William Thomas Spring Rice (10 Jan 1819 – 13 July 1870), married Elizabeth Marshall in 1855. He was Assistant Under-Secretary of State for Foreign Affairs.
- Hon. Edmund Henry Francis Louis Spring Rice (31 Mar 1821 – 16 January 1887), married Margaret Little in 1870.
- Hon. Aubrey Richard Spring Rice (15 Aug 1822 – 29 November 1897), married Anne John-Mildmay in 1852.
- Hon. William Cecil Spring Rice (1 Nov 1823 – 11 August 1880), died unmarried.

After his first wife's death in 1839, Monteagle married secondly Marianne, daughter of the Leeds industrialist John Marshall, in 1841. This union brought much needed money into the family, allowing Spring Rice to maintain his Mount Trenchard estate in Ireland and a London house. Upon Lord Monteagle of Brandon's death in February 1866, aged 75, he was succeeded in the barony by his grandson Thomas Spring Rice, the son of his eldest son Hon. Stephen Edmund Spring Rice. Lord Monteagle of Brandon's great-granddaughter was the Irish nationalist, Mary Spring Rice. His second son, Hon. Charles William Thomas Rice, was the father of the diplomat Sir Cecil Spring Rice, British Ambassador to the United States from 1912 to 1918.

Coat of arms of Thomas Spring Rice, 1st Baron Monteagle of Brandon
Crest A leopard's face Gules ducally crowned Or. Escutcheon Quarterly 1st & 4th per pale indented Argent and Gules (Rice) 2nd Azure a lion rampant Or (Meredyth) 3rd Argent on a chevron between three mascles Gules as many cinquefoils Argent (Spring). Motto Fides Non Timet (Latin for "Faith, not Fear")

== Ancestry ==
Ancestors of Thomas Spring Rice, 1st Baron Monteagle of Brandon

4. Thomas Rice
2. Stephen Edward Rice
10. Maurice FitzGerald, 14th Knight of Kerry
5. Mary Fitzgerald
11. Elizabeth Crosbie
1. Thomas Spring Rice
12. Thomas Spring
6. Thomas Spring
13. Hannah Annesley
3. Catherine Spring
14. Archdeacon Edward Wight
7. Catherine Wight

Parliament of the United Kingdom
Preceded by Hon. John Vereker	Member of Parliament for Limerick; 1820–1832	Succeeded by William Roche; David Roche (representation increased to two members 1832)
Preceded by Frederick William Trench; The Marquess of Graham	Member of Parliament for Cambridge; 1832–1839; With: George Pryme	Succeeded by George Pryme; John Manners-Sutton
Political offices
Preceded by Spencer Perceval	Under-Secretary of State for the Home Department; 1827	Succeeded by William Yates Peel
Preceded by Joseph Planta	Joint Secretary to the Treasury; 1830–1834	Succeeded by Francis Baring
Preceded by Lord Stanley	Secretary of State for War and the Colonies; 1834	Succeeded by The Earl of Aberdeen
Preceded by Sir Robert Peel, Bt.	Chancellor of the Exchequer; 1835–1839	Succeeded by Francis Baring
Peerage of the United Kingdom
New creation	Baron Monteagle of Brandon; 1839–1866	Succeeded by Thomas Spring Rice
