= Gerald Spring Rice, 6th Baron Monteagle of Brandon =

The Lord Monteagle of Brandon
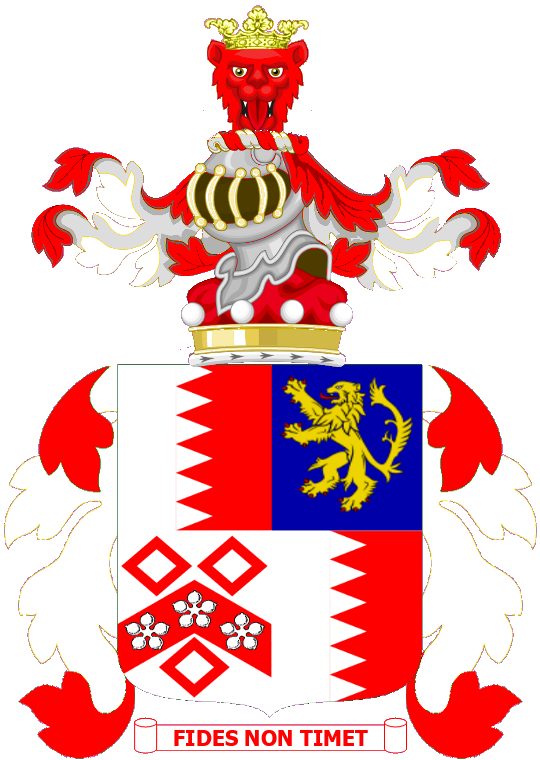
- Born: 5 July 1926; Foynes, County Limerick
- Died: 17 November 2013 (aged 87); Amesbury, Wiltshire
- Relatives: Charles Spring Rice, 5th Baron Monteagle of Brandon (father)
- Military career
- Allegiance: United Kingdom
- Branch: British Army
- Rank: Captain
- Unit: Irish Guards

Gerald Spring Rice, 6th Baron Monteagle of Brandon (5 July 1926 – 17 November 2013) was an Anglo-Irish British Army officer, banker and Conservative peer.

== Early life ==
Spring Rice was the son of Charles Spring Rice, 5th Baron Monteagle of Brandon, and an American, Emilie de Kosenko. Born at the family seat of Mount Trenchard House, he was brought up in the family's house, Glanleam, on Valentia Island, County Kerry. He was educated at Harrow School and, during the height of the U-Boat threat in 1940, at St Columba's College, Dublin.

== Career ==
Spring Rice received his call-up papers to join the British Army in August 1944, commissioning into the Irish Guards. He experienced medical problems and was hospitalised for six months, missing the deployment of his battalion to the front. He attended the Mons Officer Cadet School and was later deployed to Northern Ireland, Hamburg and Palestine. Spring Rice's father died in 1946 and he inherited the title Baron Monteagle of Brandon, returning to Ireland for a year to manage the family estate.

Spring Rice retired from the army with the rank of captain in July 1955 and worked for Panmure Gordon & Co. He subsequently worked at the London Stock Exchange between 1958 and 1976 and at Lloyds TSB from 1978 to 1998. He was part of the Honourable Corps of Gentlemen at Arms, the Queen's bodyguard, between 1978 and 1996.

Spring Rice assumed his seat in the House of Lords on 8 July 1947, taking his place on the Conservative benches. He made his maiden speech in 1992 and was an occasional contributor to debates in the chamber. Spring Rice was one of the hereditary peers who lost his right to sit in the Lords as a result of the House of Lords Act 1999.

== Family and personal life ==
He married Anne Brownlow, the only daughter of Colonel Guy Brownlow, in 1949, with whom he had four children:

- Hon. Elinor Spring Rice (born 1950), married Myles Clare Elliott on 1 June 1974.
- Hon. Angela Spring Rice (1950–2015), married, firstly, Christopher Richard Seton Sheppard on 20 October 1973 (divorced 1982) and secondly Peter Alan Kirby Ottewill in 1991.
- Charles Spring Rice, 7th Baron Monteagle of Brandon (born 1953), married Mary Teresa Glover in 1987.
- Hon. Fiona Spring Rice (born 1957), married Andrew Louis Garber on 26 March 1982.

He sold the family's last remaining house in Ireland, in County Waterford, in 2011. Lord Monteagle moved to Amesbury, Wiltshire, where he died and is buried.

Coat of arms of Gerald Spring Rice, 6th Baron Monteagle of Brandon
Crest A leopard's face Gules ducally crowned Or. Escutcheon Quarterly 1st & 4th per pale indented Argent and Gules (Rice) 2nd Azure a lion rampant Or (Meredyth) 3rd Argent on a chevron between three mascles Gules as many cinquefoils Argent (Spring). Motto Fides Non Timet

Peerage of the United Kingdom
Preceded by Charles Spring Rice	Baron Monteagle of Brandon; 1946–2013	Succeeded by Charles Spring Rice
