= Baron Monteagle of Brandon =

Peerage title in the United Kingdom

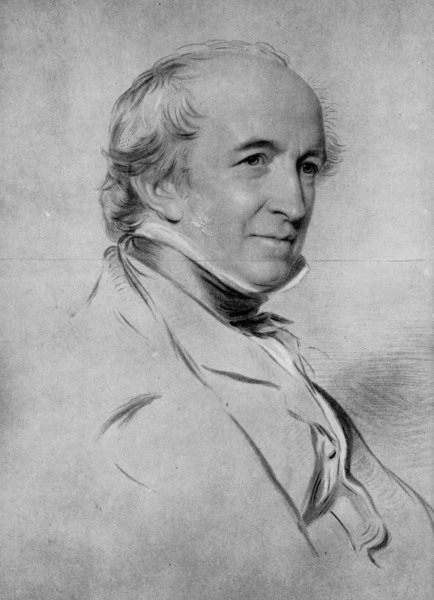
Thomas Spring Rice, 1st Baron Monteagle of Brandon.

Baron Monteagle of Brandon, in the County of Kerry, is a title in the Peerage of the United Kingdom. Before his final exile, James II had intended the title to be conferred upon one of his supporters, Stephen Rice in the Jacobite peerage. Instead, it was created in 1839 in the reign of Queen Victoria for the Whig politician Thomas Spring Rice, a descendant of Stephen Rice. He served as Chancellor of the Exchequer between 1835 and 1839. He was succeeded by his grandson, the second Baron, his eldest son the Hon. Stephen Edmund Spring Rice having predeceased him. The second Lord Monteagle was a unionist politician and was made a Knight of the Order of St Patrick in 1885. On his death, the title passed to his son, the third Baron. He held minor diplomatic office. He was succeeded by his uncle, the fourth Baron. He was the younger son of the aforementioned the Hon. Stephen Edmund Spring Rice, eldest son of the first Baron. As of 2017 the title is held by the fourth Baron's great-grandson, the seventh Baron, who succeeded his father in 2013.

The diplomat Sir Cecil Spring Rice, British Ambassador to the United States from 1912 to 1918, was the son of Hon. Charles William Thomas Spring Rice, second son of the first Baron Monteagle of Brandon.

The family seat was Mount Trenchard House, near Foynes, County Limerick.

== Barons Monteagle of Brandon (1839) ==
- Thomas Spring Rice, 1st Baron Monteagle of Brandon (1790–1866)
- Thomas Spring Rice, 2nd Baron Monteagle of Brandon (1849–1926)
- Thomas Aubrey Spring Rice, 3rd Baron Monteagle of Brandon (1883–1934)
- Francis Spring Rice, 4th Baron Monteagle of Brandon (1852–1937)
- Charles Spring Rice, 5th Baron Monteagle of Brandon (1887–1946)
- Gerald Spring Rice, 6th Baron Monteagle of Brandon (1926–2013)
- Charles James Spring Rice, 7th Baron Monteagle of Brandon (b. 1953)

The heir presumptive is the present holder's first cousin Jonathan Spring Rice (b. 1964)
The heir presumptive's heir apparent is his son Jamie Alexander Spring Rice (b. 2003).

Coat of arms of Baron Monteagle of Brandon
Crest A leopard’s face Gules ducally crowned Or. Escutcheon Quarterly 1st & 4th per pale indented Argent and Gules (Rice) 2nd Azure a lion rampant Or (Meredyth) 3rd Argent on a chevron between three mascles Gules as many cinquefoils Argent (Spring). Motto Fides Non Timet
