= Trevor Spring =

English cricketer and British Army officer

Personal information
- Full name: Trevor Coleridge Spring
- Born: 6 March 1882; Kidderpore, Bengal, India
- Died: 13 March 1926 (aged 44); London, England
- Batting: Right-handed
- Bowling: Not known

Domestic team information
- Years: Team
- 1909–1910: Somerset
- 1912–1919: Army
- First-class debut: 20 May 1909 Somerset v Lancashire
- Last First-class: 29 May 1919 Army v Cambridge University

Career statistics
Competition	First-class
Matches	11
Runs scored	324
Batting average	18.00
100s/50s	1/0
Top score	117
Balls bowled	84
Wickets	3
Bowling average	23.66
5 wickets in innings	0
10 wickets in match	0
Best bowling	3/59
Catches/stumpings	3/0
- Source: CricketArchive, 15 December 2007

Major Trevor Coleridge Spring DSO (6 March 1882 – 13 March 1926) was an English cricketer and British Army officer. A right-handed batsman, he played first-class cricket for Somerset and the Army between 1909 and 1919. He also played minor counties cricket for Devon.

== Early life ==
Spring was born in Kidderpore, Bengal, India, a descendant of the Suffolk Spring family. He was the son of the Reverend Henry Coleridge Spring and Constance Paynter, his father being a Chaplain to the Bengal establishment. He had been educated at Blundell's School before entering the Army.

== Military career ==
Spring was commissioned a Militia officer in the 4th Battalion, The Prince Albert's (Somersetshire Light Infantry), and embarked with the battalion for South Africa in March 1900, to serve in the Second Boer War. He was promoted to lieutenant on 4 February 1902, and returned with his battalion to the United Kingdom three months later. A commission into the regular army followed later that year, when he was appointed second lieutenant in the Hampshire Regiment on 3 September 1902. He became a captain in March 1911.

He fought in the First World War, was promoted to major in 1917 and was awarded the Distinguished Service Order that same year. He temporarily commanded the 2nd Battalion of the Hampshire Regiment for several months in 1917.

== Cricket career ==
Spring made his first-class debut for Somerset in a County Championship match against Lancashire in 1909. He played four more County Championship matches that year, and played three more the following year. In 1912, he played his first first-class match for the Army, scoring 117 in the second innings against the Royal Navy at Lord's. He played in the fixture again the following year.

He played his final first-class game in 1919, for the Army against Cambridge University. He later played twice for the Straits Settlements against the Federated Malay States in the 1920s.

== Family life ==
In 1910, Spring married Gwladys Emma Griffith in Winchester and they had two children. Spring died in London in 1926 at King Edward VII's Hospital following an operation. Spring caught a chill while watching a football match at Winchester and was taken to hospital. He had previously developed septic poisoning in his head while serving in Singapore, and he died of septic pneumonia following the operation to deal with the problem. On 16 March 1926 he was buried in Alwington, Devon where his father was rector.

Both his siblings had also served in the Army. Geoffrey had been killed in the Boer War and Harold had died from enteric fever.
