= Howth gun-running =

1914 incident in Ireland

The Howth gun-running (/ˈhoʊθ/ HOHTH) was the smuggling of 1,500 Mauser rifles to Howth harbour for the Irish Volunteers, an Irish nationalist paramilitary force, on 26 July 1914. The unloading of guns from a private yacht during daylight hours attracted a crowd, which prompted police and military forces to intervene. A riot ensued and the attempt to seize the weapons was unsuccessful. As the King's Own Scottish Borderers returned to barracks, they were accosted by a mob at Bachelors Walk, who threw stones and exchanged insults with the soldiers. In an event later termed the Bachelor's Walk massacre, the soldiers shot into the crowd, resulting in the deaths of four civilians and the wounding of at least 38.

== The plan ==
According to Darrell Figgis, the plan was first conceived in April 1914, in response to the Curragh incident on 20 March. Many Irish people believed that the British Army could not be relied on to enforce Home Rule when it was enacted, and many Irish Volunteers also felt that availability of arms would aid recruitment. At a lunch attended by Alice Stopford Green, Sir Roger Casement, Figgis and Eoin MacNeill, it was decided that Figgis would contact Michael O'Rahilly to raise funds to buy arms. George Fitz-Hardinge Berkeley subscribed the largest amount.

Dismayed to learn of the Larne gun-running of the Ulster Volunteers (UVF), Irish Volunteer Patrick Pearse commented: "the only thing more ridiculous than an Ulsterman with a rifle is a Nationalist without one". Casement asked Alice Green for a loan to be repaid when the volunteers bought their rifles. Casement, Figgis and Erskine Childers visited the London agent of a Belgian arms dealer. They eventually closed with a dealer in Hamburg, introduced to them by O'Rahilly, and settled on a sale of 1,500 rifles.

Transport from Germany to Ireland was carried out by Erskine Childers, Molly Childers, Sir Roger Casement, Alice Green and Mary Spring Rice. Molly Childers and Spring Rice established a board to raise more funds for the arms, and succeeded in obtaining just over £2,000. Molly kept a diary of the events, a witty historical document. The Childers offered their pleasure yacht, the Asgard, to carry 900 of the Mauser M1871 11 mm single-shot rifles and 29,000 rounds of its black powder ammunition. To buy these guns, Erskine Childers – who drafted the contract – told the German arms dealers that the rifles were destined for Mexico. The guns, although obsolete, were still functioning. They were later used in the attack on the GPO in the Easter Rising of 1916.

A much smaller number of Mauser rifles was landed from the Chotah simultaneously at Kilcoole in County Wicklow by Sir Thomas Myles, Tom Kettle, and James Meredith.

== Transporting the guns ==
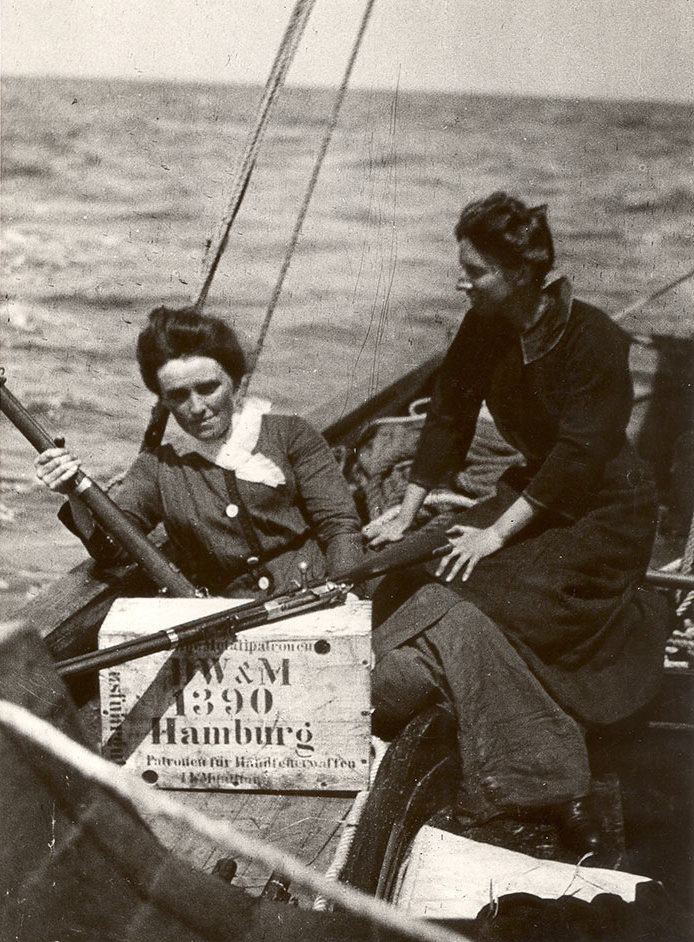
Mary Spring Rice and Molly Childers aboard the Asgard during the Howth gun-running

The Asgard and Conor O'Brien's yacht Kelpie sailed to the Ruytingen buoy near the Belgian coast, crewed by O'Brien, the Childers, Spring Rice, and two sailors from Gola Island, County Donegal: Patrick McGinley (Páidí Dhónaill Pháidí Mac Fhionnghaile) and Charles Duggan (Séarlaí Pháidí Shéarlais Ó Dugáin). There they met the tugboat that had carried the rifles from Hamburg. The arms filled the yacht's cabin entirely, leaving little space to sleep or prepare food, all of which was done on top of the arms. On the return journey, they met with bad storms. Next they encountered an entire fleet of the British navy, out in anticipation of the outbreak of the coming war, and had to sail through with their illicit cargo. Mary Spring Rice kept a diary during the smuggling operation.

== Arrival in Howth ==
The Asgard unloaded the arms in Howth harbour on 26 July 1914. It was met by members of Fianna Éireann, led by Countess Markievicz, ready with hand carts and wheelbarrows. Also present were Bulmer Hobson, Douglas Hyde, Darrell Figgis, Peadar Kearney and Thomas MacDonagh. The harbour master informed the authorities about the situation, and the Dublin Metropolitan Police were called out. Assistant Commissioner Harrell also appealed for military assistance, and a detachment of the King's Own Scottish Borderers were dispatched from their barracks at Kilmainham.The two groups met at Clontarf.

A riot ensued between Volunteers armed with batons and the police. Many policemen refused to obey orders to disarm the Volunteers and those that followed orders were unable to seize the weapons. There followed another confrontation with the military detachment in which there was more hand-to-hand fighting involving bayonets and rifle butts. There may also have been pistol shots fired by Volunteers or Fianna members. Bulmer Hobson records in a memoir that he requested Frank Flanagan (son of the nationalist councillor Michael Flanagan) to create a diversion; Flanagan "galloped his horse off at a furious pace and added to the noise".

In the confusion Thomas MacDonagh and Bulmer Hobson succeeded in ordering the back ranks of Fianna Éireann Volunteers to quietly relay the guns away and hide them in the nearby Christian Brothers' grounds. In total, police seized 19 rifles, but they had to return them when a court ruled the weapons had been taken illegally.

Some of the guns were also left in the Boland house, 15 Marino Crescent, Clontarf. Kathleen Boland (sister of Harry and Gerald) said in her statement to the Irish Bureau of Military History:

In July 1914, when the guns were brought in at Howth, my brothers were in Dungarvan but I was at home in Marino Crescent, Clontarf. When the volunteers were coming back, I knew some of them who were returning by the laneway at the back of our house, and I told them they could throw their guns into the garden and I would mind them for them. They came back for them a short time afterwards.

== Bachelors Walk ==
By this stage a crowd had gathered, and on seeing the soldiers frustrated they began to heckle and jeer. Whilst returning to their barracks, some soldiers from the Borderers reached Bachelors Walk, where they came across an unarmed but hostile crowd who baited them. The crowd mocked them for not seizing the arms. An officer who had joined them en route was unaware that their arms were prepared to fire, and gave the order to face the crowd. While he was addressing the civilians, a shot was fired by one of the troops and this was followed by a volley. Three people were killed instantly—Mrs. Duffy, James Brennan and Patrick Quinn—and thirty-eight were injured. One man, Sylvester Pidgeon, died later of bayonet wounds.

A subsequent commission of inquiry censured the city's calling out the military. The incident and casualties caused widespread outrage throughout Ireland.

== Comparison with the Larne gun-running ==
Regardless of claims of collusion between the Ulster Volunteers and the authorities over the Larne gun-running, in contrast to the Irish Volunteers who were intercepted by the police and army, the manner of both gun-runnings say more about the strategies used by either side. Whilst the Ulster Volunteers planned theirs as a secret operation to arm their members, Bulmer Hobson of the Irish Volunteers sought to create a propaganda coup. The Irish Volunteers landed their arms in daylight, under a "blaze of publicity", as close to the capital, Dublin, as possible. By contrast, the Ulster Volunteers split their weapons into three caches, used a decoy vessel to distract the authorities, and landed their arms under the cover of darkness.

The weapons obtained by each group were quite different. The unionists had landed some 24,600 rifles, mostly Gewehr 88s and M1870/87 Vetterli-Vitalis of the next generation of rifles, each with a magazine for rapid firing and smokeless powder ammunition in stripper clips for faster loading. Smokeless powder yields about 4 times the energy of black powder, resulting in flatter trajectories and longer range, and produces less muzzle blast than black powder.

With limited funds, the Irish Volunteers bought only 1500 19th-century Mauser M1871, which used gunpowder (black powder) that can foul a gun after several shots, and required each round to be hand-loaded individually. Patrick Pearse complained in a letter to Joseph McGarrity that the rifles were of an "antiquated type". The comparison adds to the conclusion that the Howth guns were bought primarily for the publicity effect and, while lethal, did not compare to the Larne guns on a like-for-like basis. Given his experience in the Second Boer War, Childers would have been well aware of these differences.

== Commemoration ==
The killing of unarmed civilians at Bachelors Walk shocked many in Ireland and beyond. "Remember Bachelor's Walk" became a rallying cry, and the ranks of the Irish Volunteers swelled as a result.

In 1961, the Irish government arranged a re-enactment of the Howth gun running, procuring the original Asgard from its owner and featuring some of the Mausers and surviving Volunteers who were present that day. An address was read by president Éamon de Valera, and a plaque was erected on the pier commemorating the events.

F. X. Martin published The Howth Gun-Running to coincide with the 50th anniversary of the event. The book is an academic work including Mary Spring Rice's log of the voyage on board the Asgard.

For the centenary celebrations, Vincent Breslin published Gun-Running' – The Story of the Howth and Kilcoole Gun-Running 1914. The book contains new sources, and full versions of all transcripts as appendixes.
