= Irish Co-operative Organisation Society =

- Formerly: Irish Agricultural Organisation Society
- Company type: Co-operative; Producer co-operative
- Industry: Agriculture, commerce, retail, services, fishing and food
- Headquarters: 84 Merrion Square, Dublin, Ireland
- Number of locations: 3 - Dublin, Cork and Brussels
- Area served: Ireland
- Services: Promoting commercial co-operative businesses and enterprise
- Members: 150,000
- Number of employees: 12,000 in Ireland; 24,000 abroad
- Website: http://icos.ie/

The Irish Co-operative Organisation Society (ICOS) is a co-operative organisation in Ireland. With its roots in the Irish Agricultural Organisation Society, ICOS promotes commercial co-operative businesses and enterprise, across multiple sections of the Irish economy.

== History ==
The Irish Agricultural Organisation Society (IAOS) was founded by Sir Horace Plunkett in 1894 to provide an overarching organisational structure for the numerous small agricultural cooperatives in Ireland at the time. By the mid-twentieth century, co-operativism had greatly expanded in Ireland, and had come to embrace many businesses and groups outside agriculture. The IAOS was re-organised and renamed as the Irish Co-operative Organisation Society to reflect these changes in the Irish economy.

== The current organisation ==
Today, ICOS member co-ops and their associated companies have more than 150,000 individual members, 12,000 employees in Ireland, a further 24,000 abroad, and a combined annual turnover of €12 billion. Some of the largest businesses in Ireland, such as Aryzta, Tirlán and Kerry Group, are members of ICOS. ICOS has evolved to serve the co-operative sector in seven core categories:

- Multipurpose dairy co-ops
- Livestock sector co-ops
- Store, trade and wholesale co-ops
- Service-related co-ops
- Community-oriented, culture and leisure co-ops
- Food, fishing and beverage co-ops
- Advisory and education-related co-ops

The organisation has offices in Dublin, Cork and Brussels.
