= British Relief Association =

19th century charity

British Association for the Relief of Distress in Ireland and the Highlands of Scotland
- Founded: January 1847
- Founded at: London, England
- Dissolved: July 1848
- Type: Famine relief
- Region served: Ireland and Scottish Highlands

The British Association for the Relief of Distress in Ireland and the Highlands of Scotland, known as the British Relief Association (BRA), was a private charity of the mid-19th century in the United Kingdom of Great Britain and Ireland. Established by a group of prominent aristocrats, bankers and philanthropists in 1847, the charity was the largest private provider of relief during the Great Irish Famine and Highland Potato Famine of the 1840s. During its brief period of operation, the Association received donations and support from many notable politicians and royalty, including Queen Victoria.

== Establishment ==
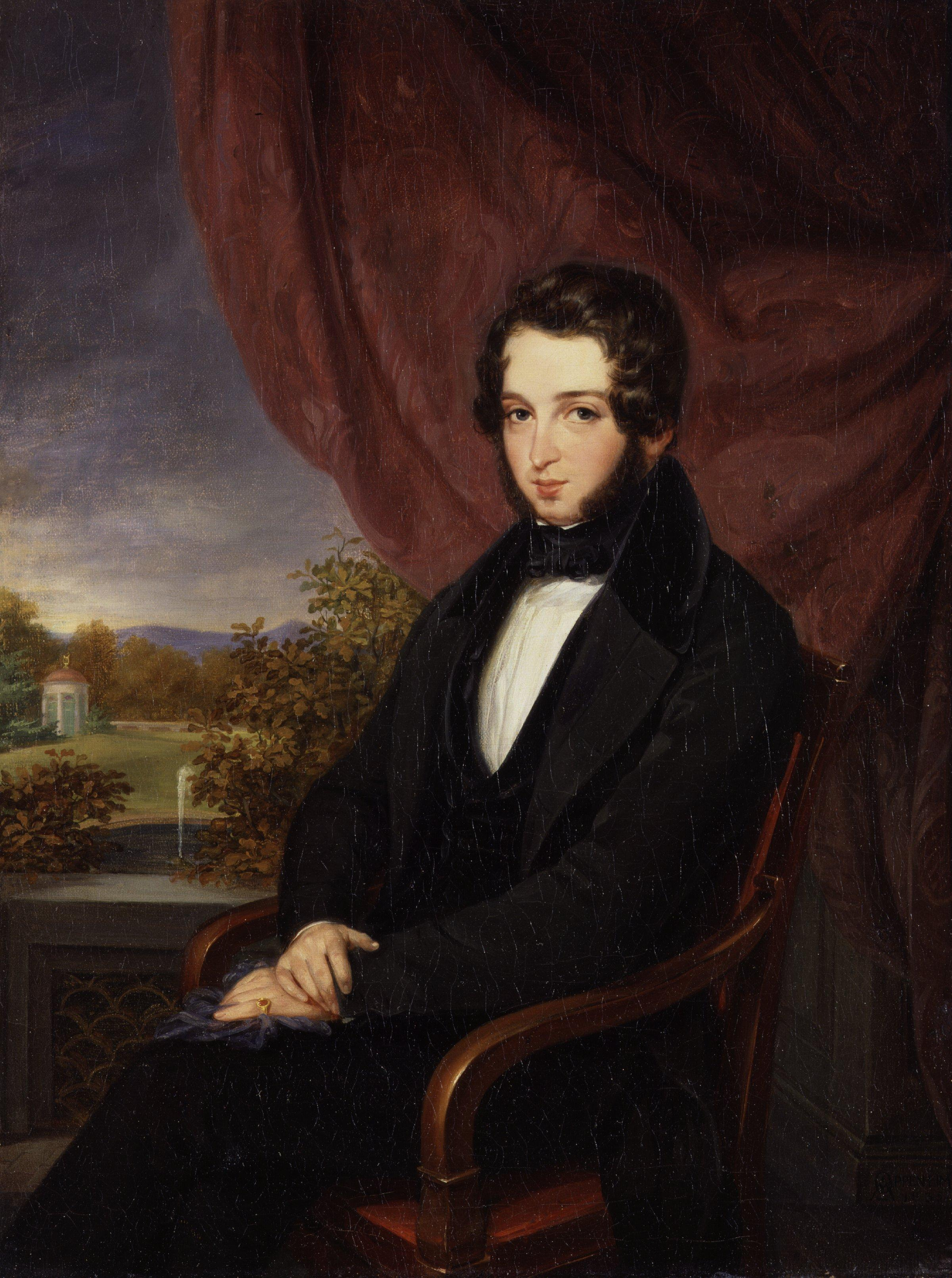
Lionel de Rothschild, at whose instigation the Association was established

When potato blight first appeared in Ireland in 1845 there was some sporadic fund-raising activity in the British Isles. However, the scale of the second blight in 1846 brought about a more concerted and widespread relief effort. In early December, a relief delegation from Skibbereen, then one of the areas hardest hit by the famine, travelled to London to lobby for a increased relief efforts. Their initiatives inspired both the founding of the British Relief Association and the Queen's Letters.

The publication of a public appeal in The Times on 24 December 1846 from an Irishman, Nicholas Cummins, led to a sudden influx of donations from British merchants and bankers, and within days over £10,000 had been raised. Consequently, the British Relief Association was established at the instigation of Baron Lionel de Rothschild to manage donations to the famine relief effort.

The BRA held its first official meeting on 1 January 1847 at the London home of Baron de Rothschild. Rothschild had invited some of the richest and most notable men in British society to the meeting, which was attended by Mayer Amschel de Rothschild, John Abel Smith, George Robert Smith, Henry Kingscote, Samuel Gurney and the Hon. Stephen Spring Rice, among others, each of whom donated at least £1,000 to the relief effort. Future meetings, held at South Sea House in London, were attended by Raikes Currie, Samuel Jones-Loyd, 1st Baron Overstone, Thomas Baring, 1st Earl of Northbrook, and David Salomons, who all also served on the Association's committee. Spring Rice, one of the two men on the committee born in Ireland, was made the BRA's secretary, as he had first-hand experience of the potato blight's effect on his family's estates in County Kerry and County Limerick. The group met almost daily to coordinate the allocation of funds.

From its inception, the British Relief Association was politically well-connected, particularly to the Whig Party, and this helped it to gain early prominence. The establishment of the charity was praised by the Quaker philanthropist William Edward Forster, who commented on the committee's commitment and desire to provide more assistance "than mere gifts of money".

The potato blight appeared in Scotland in 1845 and again in 1846. The Association therefore allocated one-sixth of its funds for relief in the Scottish Highlands. Arthur Kinnaird, 10th Lord Kinnaird and James Broun-Ramsay, 10th Earl of Dalhousie were added to the Association in order to organise the assistance in Scotland.

== Activity ==
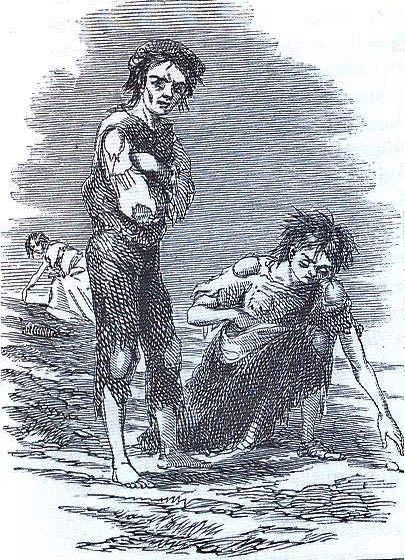
Scene at Skibbereen during the Great Famine, The Illustrated London News, 1847

Within days of the Association's being established, requests for support arrived from organisations across Ireland. The committee began lobbying financial and transport companies for assistance. On 4 January 1847 P&O donated the use of a steamship to transport food to Ireland, and the London & North Western Railway, Great Western Railway and London & South Western Railway offered free carriage to all relief going to Ireland from the Association. Much of the aid was channelled through pre-existing relief groups in Ireland. The BRA's members used their connections to encourage fundraising among municipal bodies and political groups throughout the British Empire. The BRA worked closely with the British Government to coordinate their activity, and aimed to provide assistance to those who could not be reached by the authorities. This necessitated working alongside Sir Charles Trevelyan, 1st Baronet, whose meddling in the BRA's activities was only counterbalanced by the administrative skill of Spring Rice and Paweł Strzelecki, the Association's agent in Ireland. Strzelecki's regular eye-witness reports to the Association were reprinted in several British newspapers, thus providing important evidence of the extent of the suffering to the British public.

By 1 March 1847, Strzelecki is recorded as having distributed aid in 65 localities across Ireland, which included bales of clothing, over one thousand bags of rice and almost two thousand barrels of meal. Strzelecki had spent £2,953 in County Mayo, £1,740 in County Donegal, and £1,193 in County Sligo by 1 April 1847. In Westport, County Mayo, an estimated 8,000 people were being fed on a weekly basis by Association grants during 1847.

The increasing demands on the Association led to Strzelecki being appointed Executive Director in May 1847, and several extra volunteer agents were taken on to assist in the relief effort. Lord Robert Clinton, Lord James Butler and Matthew James Higgins were among those who offered their services. By summer 1847 a temporary relief measure in the form of an Ireland-wide network of soup kitchens was feeding 3 million people a day. At this point, the BRA decided to reduce the scope of its own operations, and only Strzelecki remained in Ireland on the Association's behalf at the end of June.

In autumn 1847 the British government declared that it believed the famine to be over, and that no further money from HM Treasury would be spent on the relief effort. Nonetheless, the need for assistance was still apparent, and the Association used its residual funds to help 22 Poor law unions in Ireland. For over eight months approximately 200,000 children in Ireland were provided with free rations of food on a daily basis, and were also given clothing. By July 1848 the British Relief Association's funds were entirely depleted, and the scheme was finally shut down.

== Donations ==
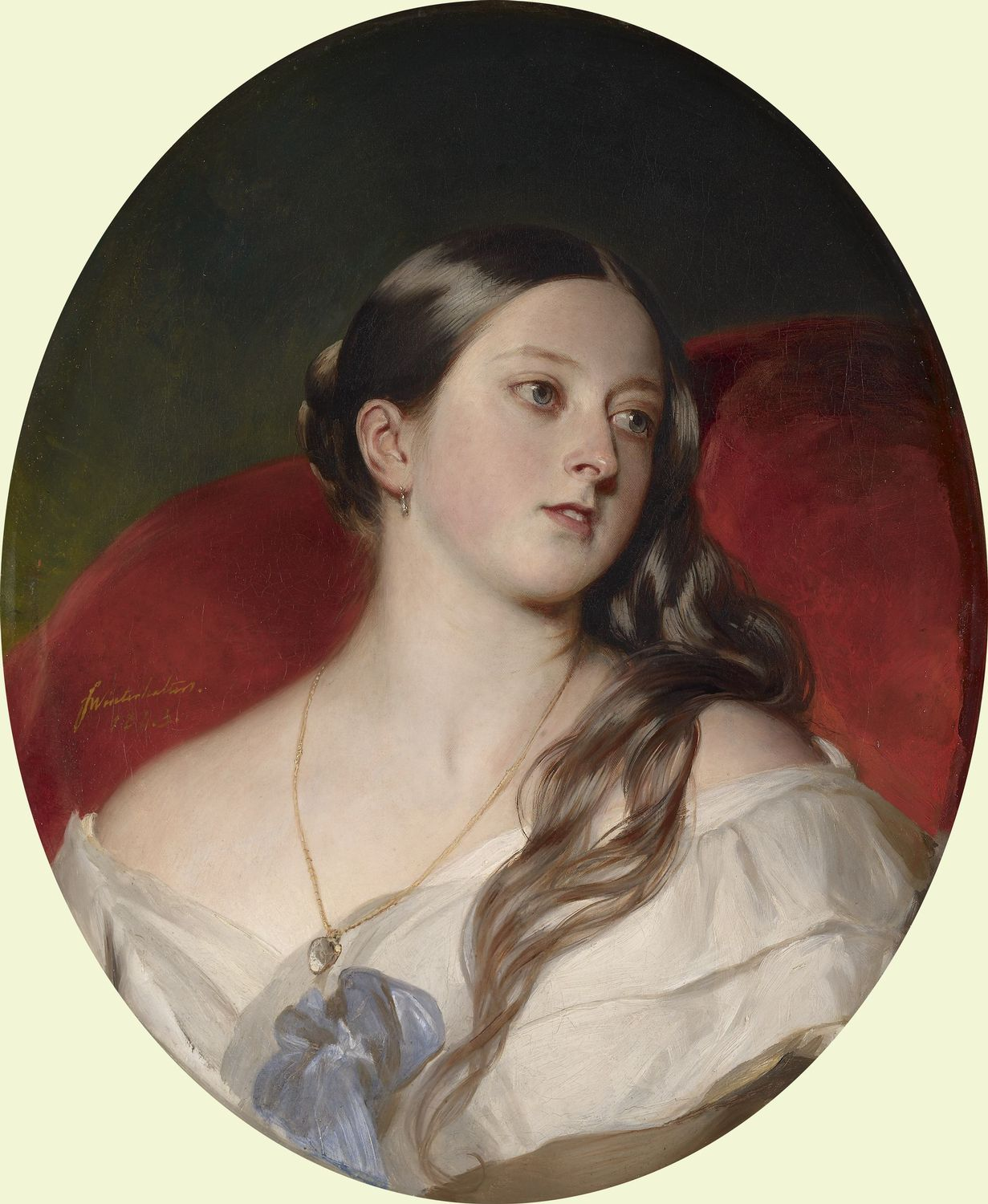
Queen Victoria donated £2000 to the British Relief Association and was the largest individual donor.

In total, approximately £500,000 (equivalent to around £52.26 million in 2019) was raised by the British Relief Association. Over 15,000 individual contributions were sent to the BRA secretariat, each of which was carefully noted in the committee's records.

The first donation the BRA received from outside the Association was from Queen Victoria. The Queen had repeatedly refused to act on advice from ministers pending the famine and was frequently derided for a lack of effort and even interest in the crisis. She donated £2,000 (equivalent to £187,000 in 2015) three days after the charity had been established. The Queen had initially sent a donation of £1,000, but the Association's Secretary, Stephen Spring Rice, refused to accept the cheque and complained to Henry Grey, 3rd Earl Grey that it was "not enough". This was communicated to the Queen, who increased her donation by £1,000. The next day Prince Albert donated £500. In the following weeks additional donations were received from Adelaide of Saxe-Meiningen (£1,000), Ernest Augustus, King of Hanover (£1,000), Prince Adolphus, Duke of Cambridge (£500), Princess Mary, Duchess of Gloucester and Edinburgh (£200) and Princess Sophia of the United Kingdom (£100).

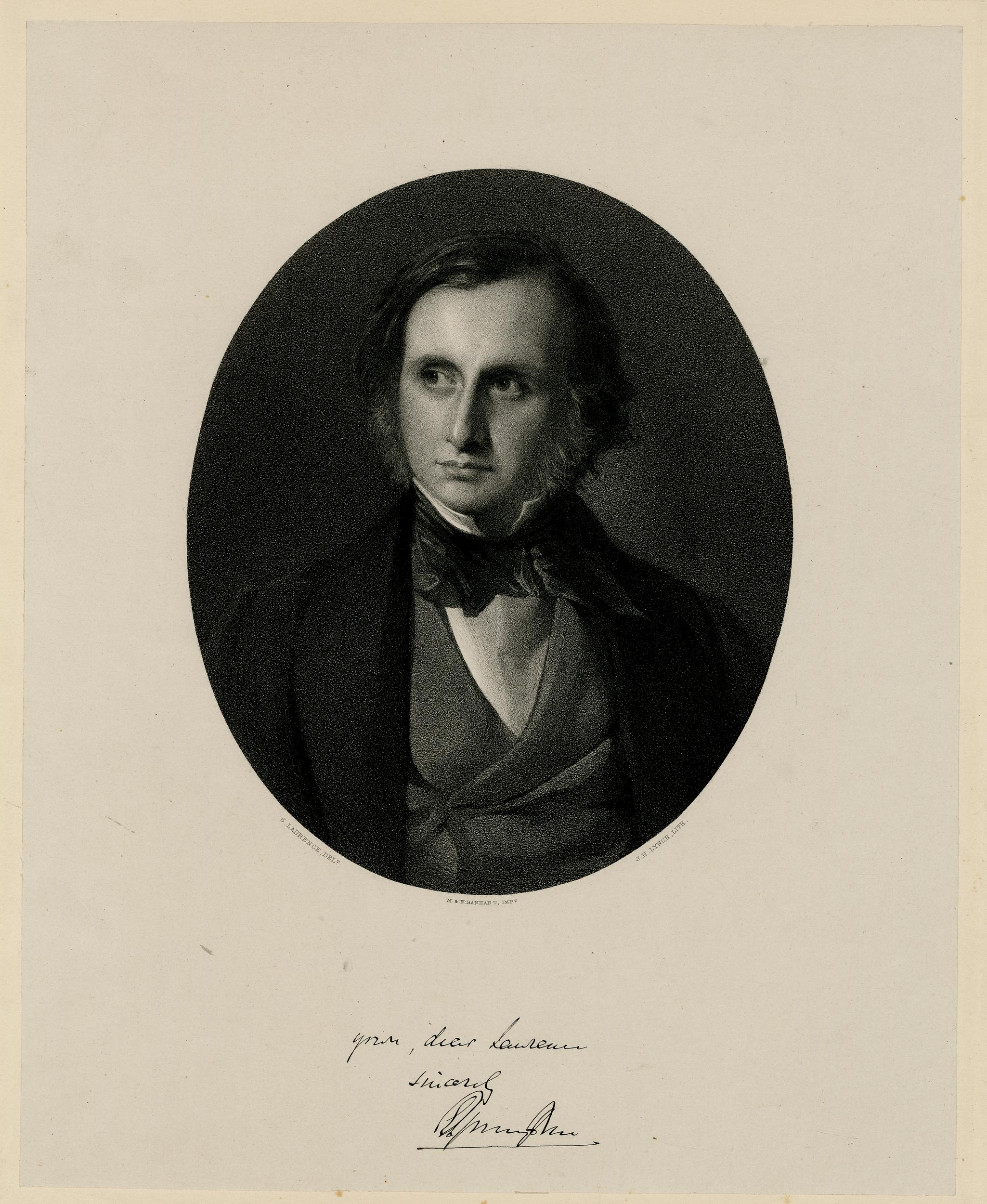
Stephen Spring Rice was secretary of the Association and one of the first donors

Additional donations were received from Abdülmecid I, who sent £1,000, and several British politicians, including Lord John Russell (£300), Sir Charles Wood (£200) and Sir Robert Peel (£200). Among the groups to make donations to the Association were the Singapore Irish Relief Fund (£31), the East India Company (£1,000), The Observer (£50), Magdalen College, Oxford (£200) and the British Royal Household (£247). A donation of £50 was received from the journalists of Punch magazine, a publication which was known for its belittling and acerbic attacks on Ireland.

The committee of the Association was ecumenical in nature, including Anglicans, Jews and Roman Catholics, and the donations received from religious bodies reflected this fact. Queen Victoria wrote open letters to Anglicans in March and October 1847, known as the 'Queen's Letters', and these appeals Church of England congregations raised around £170,000 and £30,000 respectively. Other donations were received from Methodist, Roman Catholic and Baptist groups.

Many donations were sent from overseas. Over £20,000 was sent from British North America, and Abraham Lincoln, then a young lawyer, is recorded as having given £5. The largest single donation was sent by the Bombay Relief Committee, which had raised £10,177.

== Sources ==
- Kinealy, Christine (1994), This Great Calamity, Gill & Macmillan
- Kinealy, Christine (31 October 2001), The Great Irish Famine: Impact, Ideology and Rebellion, Palgrave Macmillan, ISBN 9780333677735
- Kinealy, Christine (10 October 2013), Charity and the Great Hunger in Ireland: The Kindness of Strangers, A&C Black, ISBN 9781441117588
- Kinealy, Christine (2014), "The British Relief Association and the Great Famine in Ireland", Revue Française de Civilisation Britanique, vol. XIX, no. 2, pp. 49–66, doi:10.4000/rfcb.230
