= Lucy Knox =

Anglo-Irish poet (1845–1884)

Lucy Knox (9 November 1845 – 10 May 1884), styled The Honourable from 1870 until her death, was an Anglo-Irish poet of the Victorian era.

== Biography ==
Knox was born as Lucy Spring Rice in Hither Green, Lewisham, the second daughter of Stephen Spring Rice and Ellen Mary Frere, and a granddaughter of Thomas Spring Rice, 1st Baron Monteagle of Brandon. At the age of twenty, she married Octavius Newry Knox, grandson of Thomas Knox, 1st Earl of Ranfurly, and her married name became Knox.

Her first published work, a sonnet, appeared in an 1870 edition of Macmillan's Magazine. Knox's first collection of poetry, Sonnets and Other Poems was published privately in London in 1870. The volume contained thirty-three poems, largely concerned with social and political concerns, love, and marriage. In 1877 Knox contributed several poems to the Irish Monthly alongside her father and cousin, Aubrey Thomas de Vere. Her second and final collection of poetry, Four Pictures from a Life, and Other Poems, was published in 1884, containing forty-seven original poems, sixteen translations from German and two translations from Italian. Among them was Carlyle, a lament for her family friend Thomas Carlyle. A review in The Academy expressed admiration for Knox's genuineness and merit.

Knox died at the age of 39 having had three daughters and one son with Octavius. Their grandson was the British judge Sir John Leonard Knox.
