= Francis Spring Rice, 4th Baron Monteagle of Brandon =

Anglo-Irish peer

Commander Francis Spring Rice, 4th Baron Monteagle of Brandon (1 October 1852 – 22 December 1937) was an Anglo-Irish peer.

Spring Rice was the son of Hon. Stephen Edmond Spring Rice, son of Thomas Spring Rice, 1st Baron Monteagle of Brandon, and Ellen Mary Frere. He was educated at Harrow School, after which he joined the Royal Navy. He would eventually rise to the rank of Lieutenant before retiring. He inherited his nephew's title in 1934, but never spoke or voted in the House of Lords, dying three years later.

He married Elizabeth Ann FitzGerald, the daughter of Sir Peter FitzGerald, 19th Knight of Kerry, on 28 September 1882. Following his first's wife death, he married her sister, Julia, on 11 September 1935. He was succeeded by his second son, Charles, as his first son died as an infant.

Coat of arms of Francis Spring Rice, 4th Baron Monteagle of Brandon
Crest A leopard’s face Gules ducally crowned Or. Escutcheon Quarterly 1st & 4th per pale indented Argent and Gules (Rice) 2nd Azure a lion rampant Or (Meredyth) 3rd Argent on a chevron between three mascles Gules as many cinquefoils Argent. Motto Fides Non Timet

Peerage of the United Kingdom
Preceded by Thomas Spring Rice	Baron Monteagle of Brandon; 1934–1937	Succeeded by Charles Spring Rice
