= Stephen Spring Rice (1814–1865) =

Anglo-Irish civil servant and philanthropist

The Honourable Stephen Spring Rice
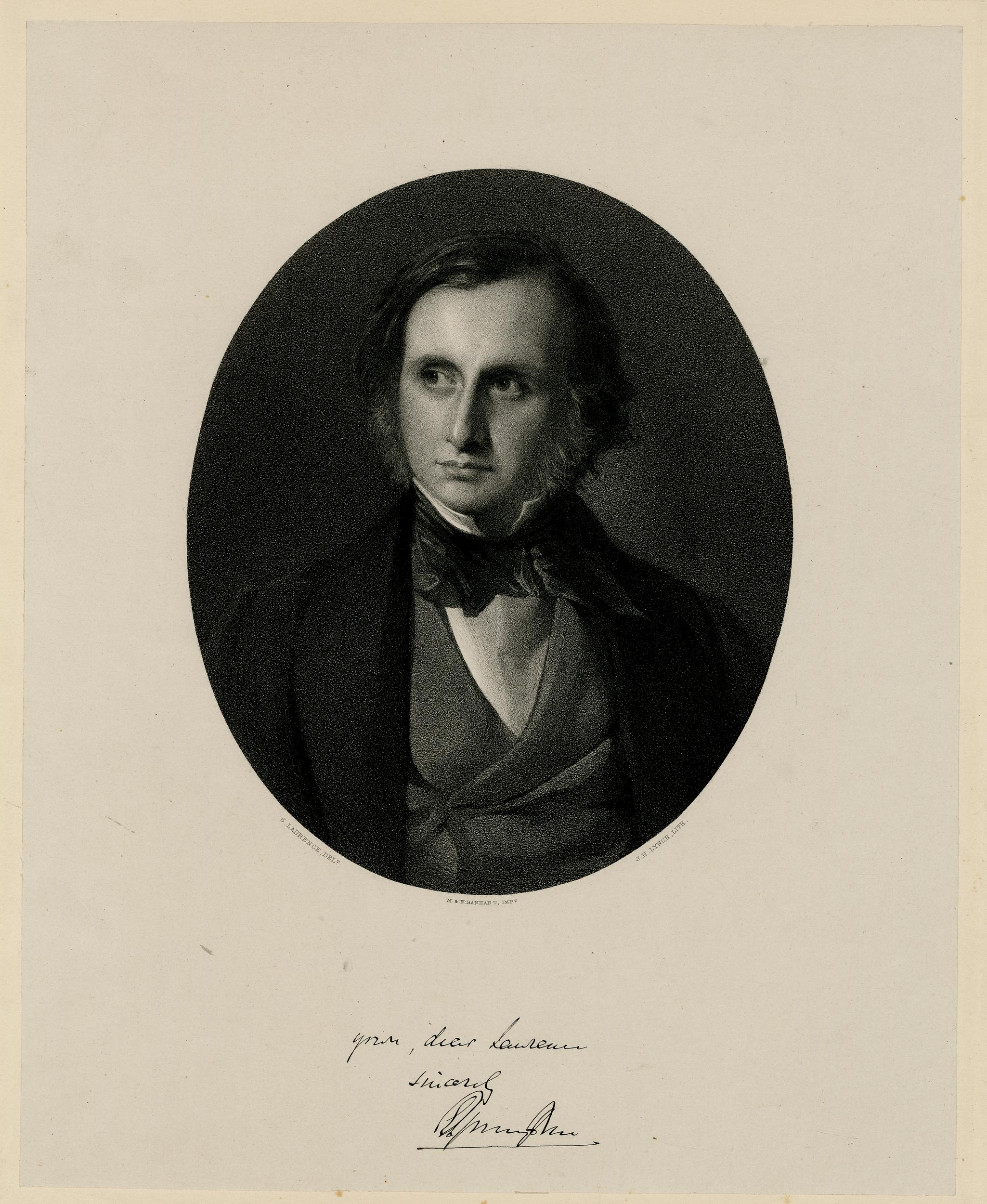

Personal details
- Born: 31 August 1814 Mount Trenchard House, Foynes, County Limerick
- Died: 9 May 1865 (aged 50)
- Spouse: Ellen Mary Frere
- Education: Trinity College, Cambridge

Stephen Edmund Spring Rice (31 August 1814 – 9 May 1865), styled The Honourable from 1839 until his death, was an Anglo-Irish civil servant and philanthropist. He served as the Secretary of the British Relief Association between 1847 and 1848.

== Early life ==
Spring Rice was the eldest son of Thomas Spring Rice, 1st Baron Monteagle of Brandon and his first wife, Lady Theodosia Pery, daughter of Edmund Pery, 1st Earl of Limerick. He was born at Mount Trenchard House, and educated at Bury St Edmunds Grammar School, Suffolk and Trinity College, Cambridge. He was a Cambridge Apostle.

== Career ==
From university, Spring Rice entered the Civil Service. He was appointed Commissioner of Customs in 1838 and Deputy Chairman of the Board of Customs in 1856. He served as High Sheriff of County Limerick in 1837.

On 1 January 1847 he attended the inaugural meeting of the British Relief Association, held at the home of his friend Baron Lionel de Rothschild. Spring Rice, whose family owned estates in Munster, had first-hand experience of the Great Irish Famine. As one of only two Irishmen on the Association's Committee, he was appointed its Honorary Secretary. Spring Rice donated £1,050 to the charity himself.

The first public donor to the Association was Queen Victoria, who sent a cheque for £1,000 to Spring Rice shortly after the charity's establishment. Spring Rice refused to accept the payment, and immediately wrote to Henry Grey, 3rd Earl Grey to complain that the donation was "not enough". This was communicated to the Palace, and the Queen's donation was doubled.

His letters show that he regularly clashed with Sir Charles Trevelyan, 1st Baronet about the nature and extent of the British Relief Association's activities, and his influence was pivotal in ensuring the charity's success. Spring Rice's frustration with the overly-bureaucratic approach regarding the giving of government relief was evident in a letter to Trevelyan dated 26 February, when he requested that the Association be allowed to make immediate use of food in government stores, offering instant payment in return.

On 15 March 1850 he was made Vice-President of Florence Nightingale's Establishment for Gentlewomen during Illness. Spring Rice was poet throughout his adult life and in 1863 he published in Dublin Irish Crime, A Letter to A. Beresford Hope, a proprietor of the Saturday Review.

== Personal life ==
He married Ellen Mary Frere, daughter of William Frere, at Grundisburgh, Suffolk on 11 March 1839. Together they had ten children:

- Hon. Aileen Spring Rice (died 15 June 1916), married John Raynor Arthur
- Thomas Spring Rice, 2nd Baron Monteagle of Brandon (31 May 1849 – 24 December 1926)
- Hon. Lucy Spring Rice (died 10 May 1884), married Octavius Knox
- Hon. Theodosia Spring Rice (died 6 July 1926)
- Mary Spring Rice (died 25 April 1868)
- Hon. Alice Spring Rice (died 23 December 1929), unmarried, died in Dublin aged 82 years
- Hon. Frederica Spring Rice (died 8 April 1924)
- Hon. Catherine Ellen Spring Rice (died 22 September 1930)
- Hon. Amy Spring Rice (died 13 June 1920)
- Francis Spring Rice, 4th Baron Monteagle of Brandon (1 October 1852 – 22 December 1937)

Spring Rice died on 9 May 1865 while returning from the Mediterranean on the steamship Tripoli. As he predeceased his father, the family title passed to Spring Rice's son, Thomas, upon the first Baron's death a year later. In 1870, all of Spring Rice's living children were granted the right to bear the title of the child of a baron.

Many of his letters are held by the National Library of Ireland and provide an important insight into political and social activity surrounding the Great Irish Famine.

Political offices
Preceded by Sir Vere de Vere, Bt.	High Sheriff of County Limerick; 1837	Succeeded by James Denis Lyons
