= Henry Spring =

English Knight and landowner

Sir Henry le Spring (died before 1311), also referred to as Lord Henry Spring, was an English knight and landowner in northern England.

== Biography ==
He was born into the Anglo-Norman Le Spring family, who held large estates in the County Palatine of Durham and Northumberland. He was the son of another Sir Henry le Spring, a knight, by an unknown wife. He served as a squire to Sir John Coilet of Barmelston. Henry le Spring was knighted himself after having fought for Henry III at the Battle of Lewes in 1264. He became Lord of the Manor of Houghton, near the present-day City of Sunderland, after it was granted to him by Robert Fitzgerald, Lord of Raby. The estates surrounding the town had been in the possession of the Spring family since shortly after the Norman Conquest, and a result it became known as Houghton-le-Spring. He served as Knight of the Shire for the Northumberland constituency at least once.

Henry Spring married Albreda, the daughter and heiress of Robert Bernard. One of his sons, Sir John Spring, was murdered in his manor house at Houghton in 1313 by Robert Lascelles, the husband of his lover. Henry's daughter, Mary, married Sir Roland de Bellasise, who had fought with him at Lewes. Henry's wife was recorded as being a widow by 1311.

He is buried in the Church of St Michael and All Angel in Houghton-le-Spring, where he has an elaborate effigy alongside his son-in-law.
