= Edward Wight =

Anglican priest

Edward Wight, D.D. was an Anglican priest in Ireland in the second half of the 18th century.

Wight was educated at Trinity College, Dublin. He was Archdeacon of Limerick from 1751 until his death in 1790.
