= Asgard (yacht) =

Yacht owned by Erskine Childers

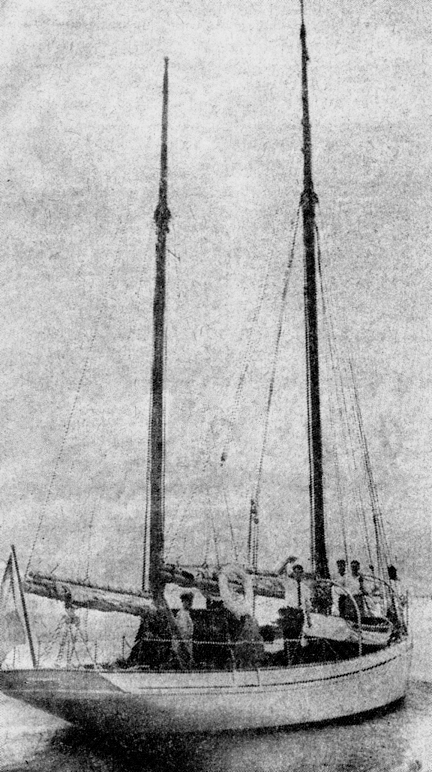
- Asgard at sea, near Dublin

History
- Name: Asgard
- Builder: Colin Archer
- Laid down: April 1905
- Launched: August 1905
- Status: Preserved in Collins Barracks, Dublin

General characteristics
- Length: 15.5 m (51 ft)
- Beam: 4 m (13 ft)
- Sail plan: Gaff rigged

Asgard is a 51-foot (16 m) gaff-rigged yacht. She was owned by the English-born writer and Irish nationalist Erskine Childers and his wife Molly Childers. She is most noted for her use in the Howth gun-running of 1914.

Asgard is sometimes mistaken for Dulcibella, the boat in Robert Erskine Childers's classic novel The Riddle of the Sands. This was based on a smaller vessel, Vixen, previously owned by Childers.

== Design and early use ==
Asgard was bought for £1,000 in 1904 (£84,000 in 2006) from one of Norway's most famous boat designers, Colin Archer. The interior was custom built to the specifications of Childers and his wife Molly. Molly, disabled following a childhood accident, sometimes took the helm of Asgard, strapped onto the deck with harnesses so she could navigate the rough waters of the Irish Sea.

Asgard's most famous trip was the Howth gun-running in 1914. Childers, his wife and a small crew, made the channel crossing with a hold full of rifles from Germany into Howth harbour just north of Dublin, to arm the Irish Volunteers in response to the arming of the Ulster Volunteers by the Larne gun-running in April. There is a plaque on the dock wall in Howth as a memorial to this historic boat journey.

Shortly after the Easter Rising, Asgard was put into long-term dry-dock in Northern Wales, where she was sold in 1928.

== Restoration and display ==
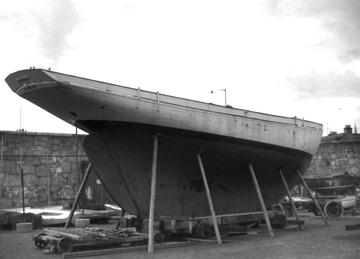
Asgard, 1960 Dublin Docks.

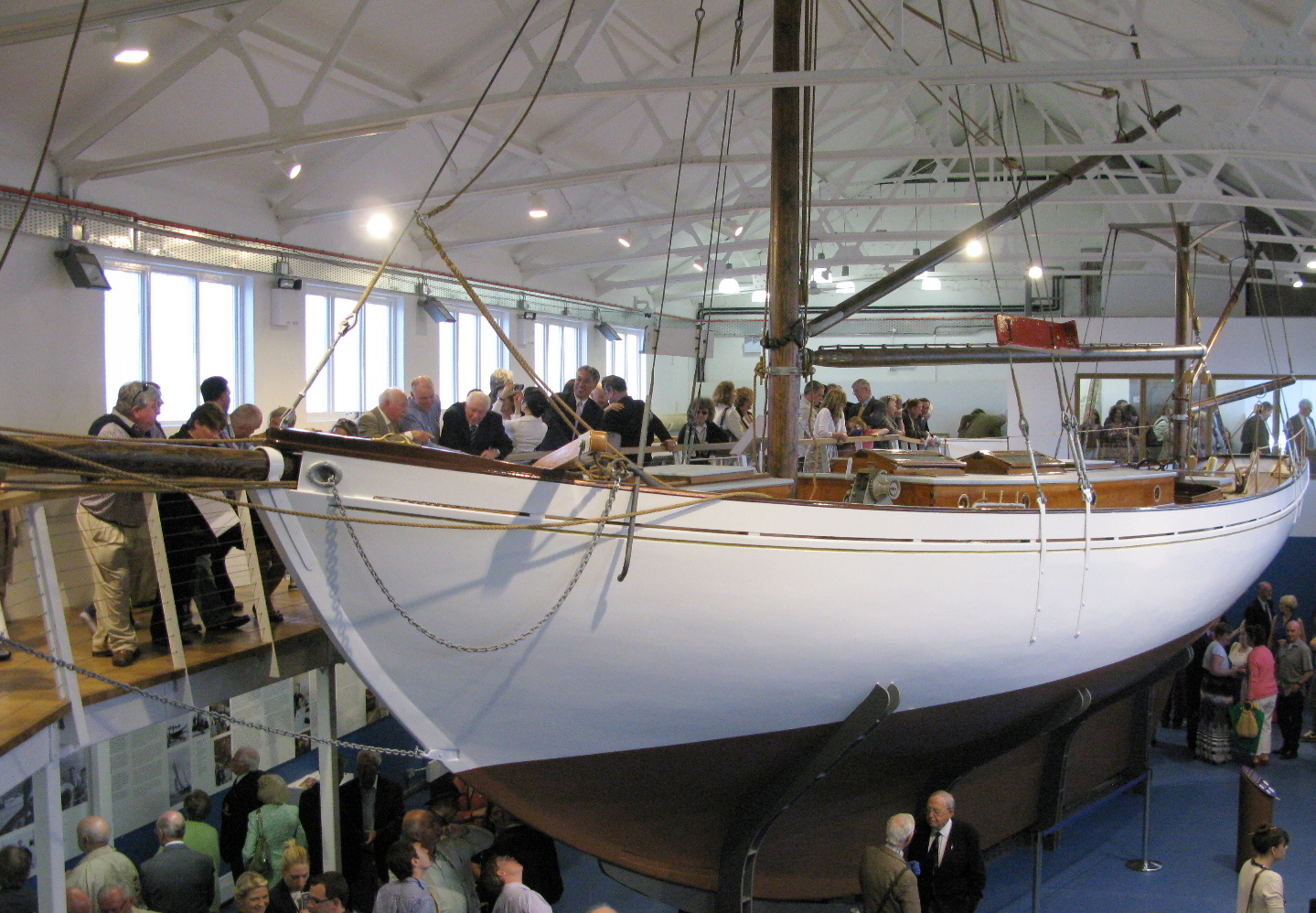
The newly restored Asgard at Collins Barracks. Taken at official opening, 9 August 2012.

In 1961, she was located in the River Truro, Cornwall by the journalist Liam MacGabhann after lobby, the Irish Government procured the ageing vessel and returned her to Howth on 30 July 1961 in a re-enactment of the 1914 landing, using some of the original rifles and surviving members of the Irish Volunteers. In 1968 the government formed the committee known as Coiste an Asgard and placed Asgard under their guidance and control to be used as a sail training vessel for the young people of Ireland. Sail training cruises were carried out on Asgard each year from 1969 to 1974. It was used for sail training by the Irish Navy for a number of years in the 60s, and as the national sail training vessel, under the command of Capt. Erik Healy, from 1969 to 1974, when it was dry-docked and installed inside Kilmainham Gaol in Dublin where it remained as a museum attraction, until 2001.

In 2007 new restoration work began. It focussed on preserving as much as possible of the original wooden hull and its metal supports, before replacing pieces with new material. In a project led by master shipwright John Kearon, over 70% of the original deck and hull were preserved.

Since August, 2012 the restored Asgard is on permanent display in Collins Barracks, Dublin. The yacht and related artefacts are now on permanent display in an exhibition titled ' Asgard: The 1914 Howth Gun Running Vessel Conserved'. Nessa Childers MEP and her half-brother Prof. Rory Childers, grandchildren of Erskine and Molly, were the guests of honour at the official opening by Arts Minister Jimmy Deenihan.

== See also ==
- Asgard II
