= Mary Spring Rice =

Irish nationalist

Mary Ellen Spring Rice (14 September 1880 – 1 December 1924) was an Irish nationalist activist during the early 20th century. She was actively involved in gun-running during 1913–14, notably as part of the Howth Gun Run.

== Biography ==
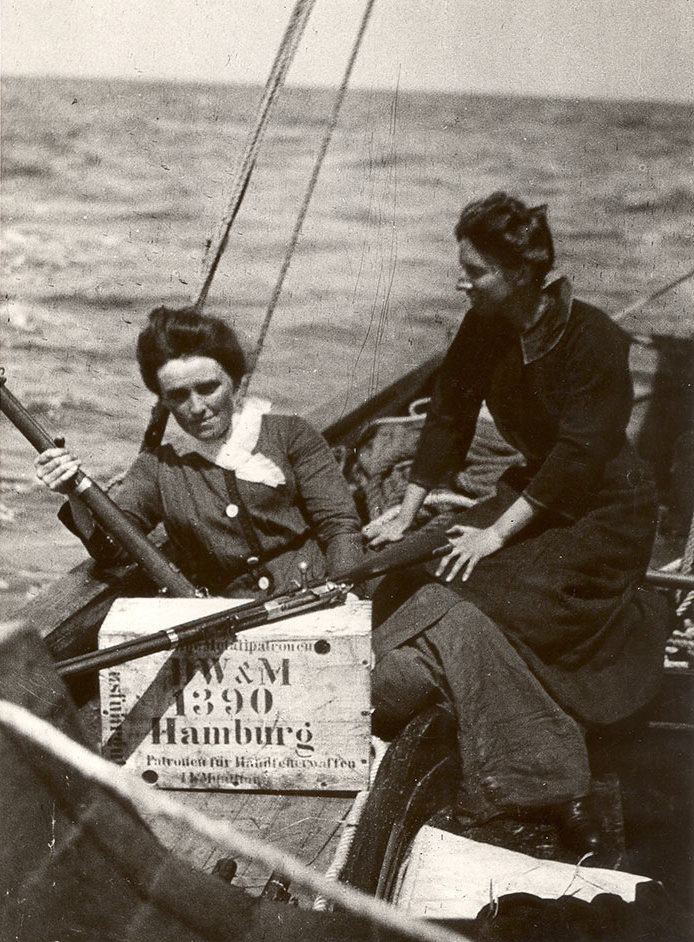
Spring Rice and Molly Childers aboard the Asgard during the Howth gun-running

Spring Rice was the second child and only daughter of the moderate Unionist peer, Thomas Spring Rice, 2nd Baron Monteagle of Brandon, and his wife Elizabeth, eldest daughter of Bishop Samuel Butcher. She grew up at Mount Trenchard House near Foynes, County Limerick and learned to speak fluent Irish.

Before the First World War, Spring Rice hosted many Irish nationalist and Conradh na Gaeilge meetings at her home, attended Gaelic League gatherings in London and Dublin, and became a friend of the influential Gaelic revival figure, Douglas Hyde, through her cousin Nelly O'Brien. She also paid for the hiring of an Irish language teacher to give classes in her local national school. In 1910, Spring Rice became an early member of the United Irishwomen and the following year she joined the executive of the Limerick branch of the organisation. Her growing nationalism was influenced by Erskine Childers, who she met and befriended after attending an event in Westminster Hall with the United Irishwomen. Immediately before the outbreak of the war, Spring Rice was on the Anglo-Irish committee formed in London in May 1914 to help the Irish Volunteers.

=== Gun-running ===
It was through her connection to the Irish Volunteers that, during 1913 and 1914, Spring Rice was actively involved in gun-running, most notably the Howth gun-running. This involved helping to ship weapons to be used in an Irish uprising from Germany into Ireland. Together with Molly Childers, she raised £2,000 towards the purchase of 900 Mauser rifles from Germany, many of which were used in the 1916 Easter Rising. Spring Rice sailed on the Asgard to collect the guns and helped to unload them in Ireland.

During the Irish War of Independence, she allowed her Mount Trenchard home to be used as a safe house by Irish Republican Army fighters and the family boat was used to carry men and arms over the Shannon Estuary.

== Death ==
Spring Rice started to suffer from tuberculosis in 1923, and died in a sanatorium in Clwyd, Wales, on 1 December 1924. She was buried in Mount Trenchard, Loghill, County Limerick, Ireland. When her coffin arrived at Foynes railway station on 4 December 1924 it was greeted by several society members, including members of the Irish Transport and General Workers' Union (I.T.G.W.U.) Foynes Branch, lined up in military formation. The following day, the entirety of the Foynes Branch I.T.G.W.U. attended the funeral

Her photographic portrait as a young girl by Eveleen Myers is in the collection of the National Portrait Gallery, London.
