= Mount Trenchard House =

Stately home near Foynes, Ireland

Mount Trenchard House is an Irish stately home located near Foynes, County Limerick, overlooking the River Shannon. It was the ancestral seat of the Rice, and subsequently Spring Rice, family.

== History ==
The estate was originally granted to Francis Trenchard on 20 June 1612 by a charter of James I. He constructed the first house on the site. The current Mount Trenchard House was built in the late 1770s by the Anglo-Irish Rice family, who were major landowners in County Limerick. The house was built in the late Georgian style, but has some Victorian additions. The family estate was greatly increased in 1785 following the marriage of Stephen Edward Rice to a daughter of the Spring family, also important landowners in south-west Ireland. Their descendants were raised to the peerage as Barons Monteagle of Brandon in 1839. At this stage, the family estate was approximately 6,500 acres. The house remained the seat of the Spring Rice family for 175 years, although its surrounding estate was gradually reduced in size. In 1894, the house was used as the meeting place for the founders of the Irish Agricultural Organisation Society, of which Lord Monteagle was one. During the Irish War of Independence, Mount Trenchard was used as a safe house by IRA fighters, looked after by Hon. Mary Spring Rice. In 1944, the house was occupied by the Irish Army. In 1947, the house and estate were sold to Lady Holland, who lived there until 1953. That year, the house was again sold to the Sisters of Mercy, who opened a private school for girls. They extended the complex to include a large 1960s dormitory block, classrooms and a church.

Mount Trenchard was sold again in 1996 and became a centre for holistic medicine. The house was later used by the Reception and Integration Agency as an accommodation centre for asylum seekers. until it stopped operating as a direct provision centre in February 2020 after a contract was not renewed. Soon after the start of the Russian invasion of Ukraine, it began to be used again as an accommodation centre, for refugees from Ukraine. and was still in use for this purpose as of March 2024.
