= Erskine Childers =

Erskine Childers may refer to:

- Erskine Childers (author) (1870–1922), author and Irish nationalist who served as secretary-general of the Irish delegation that negotiated the Anglo-Irish Treaty in 1921
- Erskine Hamilton Childers (1905–1974), Fianna Fáil minister who became President of Ireland, son of the above
- Erskine Barton Childers (1929–1996), UN civil servant, Senior Adviser to UN Director-General for Development and International Economic Co-operation, son of the above
