= Rita Childers =

Irish press attaché, wife of President Erskine Childers

- Childers in 1973
- Born: Margaret Mary Dudley; 25 February 1915; Ballsbridge, Dublin, Ireland
- Died: 9 May 2010 (aged 95); Glenageary, County Dublin, Ireland
- Resting place: Roundwood, County Wicklow, Ireland
- Education: City, University of London
- Spouse: Erskine Hamilton Childers (m. 1952; died 1974)
- Children: Nessa

Margaret Mary Childers (née Dudley; 19 July 1915 – 9 May 2010) was a press attaché at the British Embassy in Dublin, civil servant and activist. She became the wife of the 4th president of Ireland, Erskine Hamilton Childers, and later was a candidate for the presidency.

== Early life and family ==
Margaret Mary Dudley was born on 25 February 1915 at the family home on Elgin Road, Dublin. Her parents were Joseph and Marcella Dudley (née Vereker). She was the sixth child of eight children. Her father was a solicitor. Childers was educated at Loreto and Holy Cross schools, and later Muckross Park College. Due to her father's long illness and premature death, she and her sisters were unable to attend university. She completed a secretarial course and took up her first job at the age of 17 as a secretary at a Dublin antiques dealer. She went on to work at the St John Ambulance Brigade as an assistant secretary in the welfare department for five years, overseeing the running of three canteens for malnourished mothers in the inner city of Dublin.

Childers' daughter, Nessa, entered politics in 2004 when she was elected as a county councillor on Dún Laoghaire–Rathdown County Council for the Green Party. Childers' stepson, Erskine Barton Childers, served as a senior official in the United Nations.

== Life as Mrs. Childers ==
Childers took up a position as an assistant press attaché in 1942 in the British representative office in Dublin. At the recommendation of Sir John Maffey, she moved to London in 1943 to work for Nicholas Mansergh at the Irish desk in the empire division of the British Ministry of Information, before moving to the British Foreign Office briefly. In 1946, she moved back to Dublin to work in the British Embassy as an assistant press attaché. It was while working in the embassy that Childers met her husband, a widower who was also a senior member of Fianna Fáil, in 1952 at a diplomatic lunch. The couple's mixed marriage (Erskine Hamilton Childers was an Anglican, she a Roman Catholic) caused some controversy; the then Roman Catholic Archbishop of Dublin, John Charles McQuaid tried to discourage them from marrying and forbade the marriage in Dublin. McQuaid also insinuated that this was her only chance at marriage at all. They eventually opted to marry in Paris at St Joseph, Avenue Hoche on 16 September 1952. The Irish ambassador, Cornelius Cremin, acted as best man. McQuaid reportedly later apologised to the couple for his behaviour. After her marriage, Childers resigned from the embassy.

While her husband was a government minister, Childers hosted social events in their home and often accompanied him on official visits. Erskine was elected President of Ireland in June 1973, and she encouraged him to modernise the role of the Irish president. They travelled around Ireland, in particular visiting more deprived areas of the country. Erskine died suddenly on 17 November 1974. The political parties secretly agreed a deal to make Mrs Childers the new president. However, a political dispute in which a partially deaf Fine Gael minister in the National Coalition government, Tom O'Donnell, misheard a journalist's question about Mrs Childers and confirmed that she would be the next president led the plan to collapse. Her late husband's political party, Fianna Fáil, withdrew its support for her and instead proposed former chief justice Cearbhall Ó Dálaigh, who was eventually elected unopposed as the joint nominee of the government and main opposition parties in the presidential election of 1974. Reflecting on her treatment during this period, she commented that "I saw how, once again, a woman in Ireland can be regarded as mere baggage."

Having left Áras an Uachtaráin (the presidential residence) Mrs Childers became an outspoken critic both of her late husband's former colleagues in Fianna Fáil, and of the office of president. Following the resignation of Cearbhall Ó Dálaigh as president in October 1976, Mrs Childers called for the office's suspension. She shared her husband's distrust of Charles Haughey.

The Irish Apollo 17 Goodwill Moon Rock was given to Irish president Childers. After her husband's death, Childers requested the rock as a keepsake of her late husband, which was denied. The Irish Goodwill Moon Rock is now housed at the National Museum of Ireland.

== Later life and death ==
She continued to be a prominent public figure, engaging in public speaking to community and women's groups. She advocated for more women to be active in political and public life, and for greater efforts to be made in fostering a sense of community across Irish society. In 1975 she took part in the Irish Countrywomen's Association ecumenical peace march, and spoke about the problem of alcohol abuse in Ireland. She was a supporter of the Save Wood Quay Campaign and had a continuing interest in better relations between Northern Ireland and the Republic.

Childers found a small automatic pistol in 1995, which had belonged to her husband. It was the possession of this weapon by her father-in-law, Robert Erskine Childers, that led to his trial and execution in 1922. The weapon had been given to Childers by Michael Collins. Childers presented to pistol to the Defence Forces and it is now held in the National Museum of Ireland, Collins Barracks.

Childers died on 9 May 2010 in Carysfort Nursing Home, Dublin. She is buried at Derralossory churchyard, County Wicklow, beside her husband.
