= Margaret Cushing Osgood =

American writer and poet

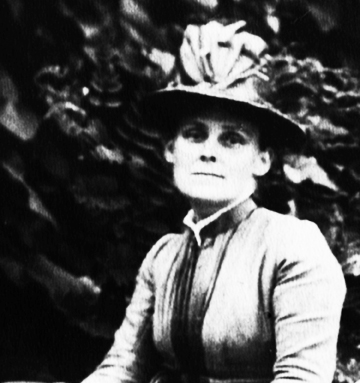
- Boston, 1896
- Born: Margaret Cushing Pearmain; 1847
- Died: 1941 (aged 93–94)
- Occupation: Writer
- Children: Mary Alden Childers; Gretchen Osgood Warren; Hamilton Osgood

Margaret Cushing Pearmain Osgood (1847–1941), was an American writer and poet. She was the mother of Mary Alden Childers and Gretchen Osgood Warren and the maternal grandmother of Erskine Hamilton Childers, the fourth President of Ireland from 1973 to 1974. She was the daughter of William Robert Pearmain and Cordelia Miller Smith.

== The City Without Walls ==
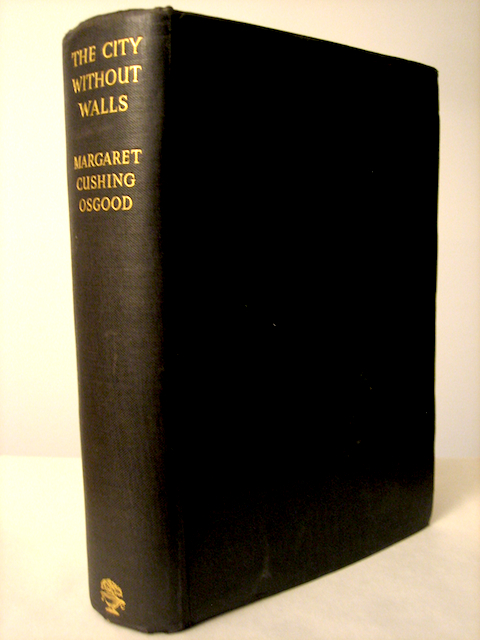
1st Edition

Osgood was known primarily for her exhaustively researched book, The City Without Walls : An Anthology setting forth the Drama of Human Life. It's a collection of the world's spiritual literature, spanning both religious and cultural differences. In its introduction, the famed Irish writer and poet A.E. George William Russell said "I do not know of any better book to dispel, without controversy, the arrogance of ignorance...."
