= Molly Childers =

American-Irish writer and nationalist (1875–1964)

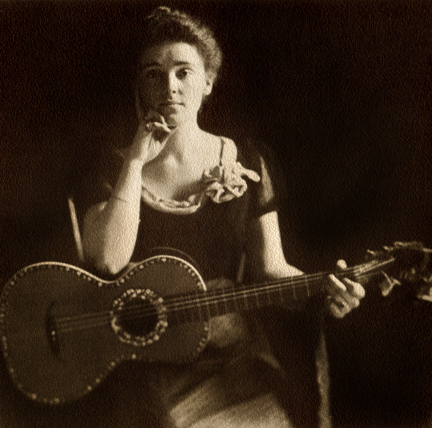
- Born: Mary Alden Osgood; 14 December 1875; Boston, Massachusetts, U.S.
- Died: 1 January 1964 (aged 88); Sandymount, Dublin, Ireland
- Resting place: Roundwood, County Wicklow, Ireland
- Education: University of Nottingham
- Spouse: Erskine Childers (m. 1904; died 1922)
- Children: 3, including Erskine Hamilton Childers
- Parents: Hamilton Osgood; Margaret Cushing Osgood
- Relatives: Gretchen Osgood Warren (sister); Erskine Barton Childers (grandson); Nessa Childers (granddaughter)

Mary Alden Childers MBE (née Osgood; 14 December 1875 – 1 January 1964), known as Molly Childers, was an American-born Irish writer and nationalist. A daughter of Dr Hamilton Osgood and Margaret Cushing Osgood of Beacon Hill, Boston, Massachusetts, her older sister was Gretchen Warren. She married fellow Irish writer and nationalist, Erskine Childers. Their son, Erskine Hamilton Childers, became the fourth President of Ireland.

== Early life and family ==
Childers, affectionately called "Molly", was born into a reputable Bostonian family that lived at 8 Beacon Street, Beacon Hill, Boston, Massachusetts. Physically disabled from the age of three following a skating accident, Childers was educated at home and was not mobile for the first 12 years of her life. Eventually she was able to move enough to ride horses, but she was never capable of walking without crutches. Her father, Dr Osgood, was a student of Dr Louis Pasteur and spent time with him in France and Switzerland. It was this research with Pasteur that enabled him to bring the first rabies antitoxin back to Boston, and in turn the United States. The Osgood's ancestry was directly linked to John Quincy Adams and Anne Hutchinson, and Childers was very proud and outspoken about this connection. Her mother Margaret Cushing Osgood encouraged her to read and to pursue a life in academia, as her disability would hinder other careers. The Osgood family home on Beacon Street was next door to the Boston Athenæum. Childers spent years of her childhood inside this library, reading for hours every day; several members of the Osgood family were among the first proprietors of the institution.

== Marriage ==
In late 1903, Childers was seated next to Erskine Childers at a dinner given by her aunt on Beacon Hill. Erskine was in Boston on a ceremonial trip with Lord Denbigh and the Honourable Artillery Company. By January 1904, after some weeks of courtship, the two were married at Trinity Church in Boston. One Boston newspaper described their wedding as the most "distinguished gathering" of the season.

== Charities ==
During World War I, Childers was involved in politically difficult work with the Committee for Relief in Belgium. Due to the changing diplomatic situation with Germany during 1915–1918, the Belgian wartime refugees displaced by the conflict were at the centre of a cross-channel tug-of-war over the supply of desperately needed aid. She raised funds for them alongside her sister and mother.

In January 1918, King George V conferred an MBE on her for this work. She was also awarded the Médaille de la Reine Elisabeth from Queen Elisabeth of Belgium.

She and her husband were members of the Irish White Cross Society, which existed before the Irish Red Cross, she as a trustee, and he as a member of its executive committee. Activist Maud Gonne was also a member of this organisation.

From 1916 to 1918, Childers was honorary secretary of the Chelsea War Refugees Fund.

After the Great War, in 1920, she joined the Women's International League for Peace and Freedom (WILPF), one of the world's oldest peace organisations, later to be merged into the UNESCO of the United Nations.

== Ireland and Republicanism ==
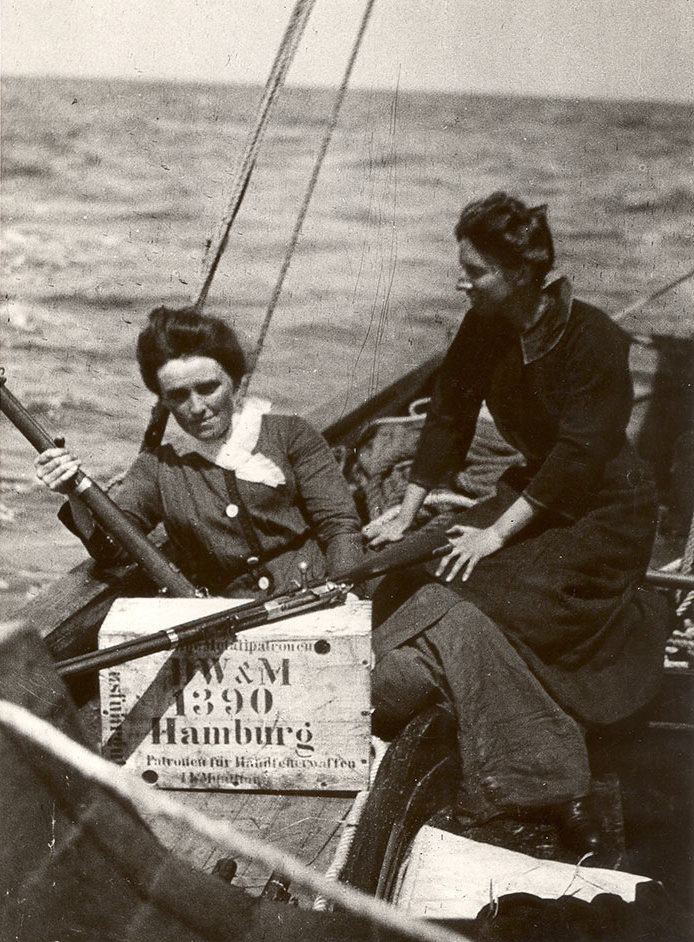
Mary Spring Rice and Childers aboard the Asgard during the Howth gun-running

She was central to the July 1914 Irish Volunteers Howth gun-running on her and her husband's yacht Asgard. A photograph taken at the time with fellow-sailor Mary Spring Rice shows her beside the rifles and ammunition boxes.

== Allegation of spying ==
In 2006, historian Michael T. Foy published a book, Michael Collins's Intelligence War: The Struggle Between The British and the IRA 1919–1921, in which he suggested that Childers might have been a spy for the British during the Irish War of Independence. Foy speculated that she had volunteered for British intelligence before the couple moved to Ireland in 1918. The claim was described by reviewers in Irish newspapers as "dramatic", "sensational" and "a bottle of smoke".

The author had discovered in The National Archives a series of intelligence reports to indicate that a woman with high-level access to Sinn Féin had been passing intelligence to British forces. However, the name of the agent had been obscured by blue pencil. The author noted circumstantial evidence which, in his opinion, suggested that Childers might have been the spy, including the assertion that she had not shared her husband's enthusiasm for Irish independence and the person's use of American phraseology. He proposed that Childers had "the qualities to carry off such a dangerous role" and that she "consistently displayed intelligence, courage, decisiveness and single-minded determination", but acknowledged that there was no conclusive evidence. However, Foy went beyond scholarly speculation when he claimed that she was the only person who could fit the profile of the spy.

Nessa Childers, the daughter of Childers' son President Erskine Hamilton Childers, dismissed the evidence as "circumstantial", saying in a television interview that "it just doesn't fit with her character". She questioned the evidence that the spy was female and noted: "Up until the day she died she had photographs of Liam Mellows, Liam Brady and Rory O'Connor on her bedside and she revered them. It doesn't follow that such a person could have put those people's lives at risk."

Historian Peter Hart said Foy's theory "does seem to fit the facts as presented", but noted that "all the other facts we know about thoroughly republican Molly suggest that it simply cannot have been true, and there are other good reasons to be cautious". Hart noted that the inaccuracy of some of the intelligence suggested a source trying to tell British "hardliners just what they wanted to hear".

== See also ==
- List of peace activists
