= Nessa Childers =

Irish former politician (born 1956)

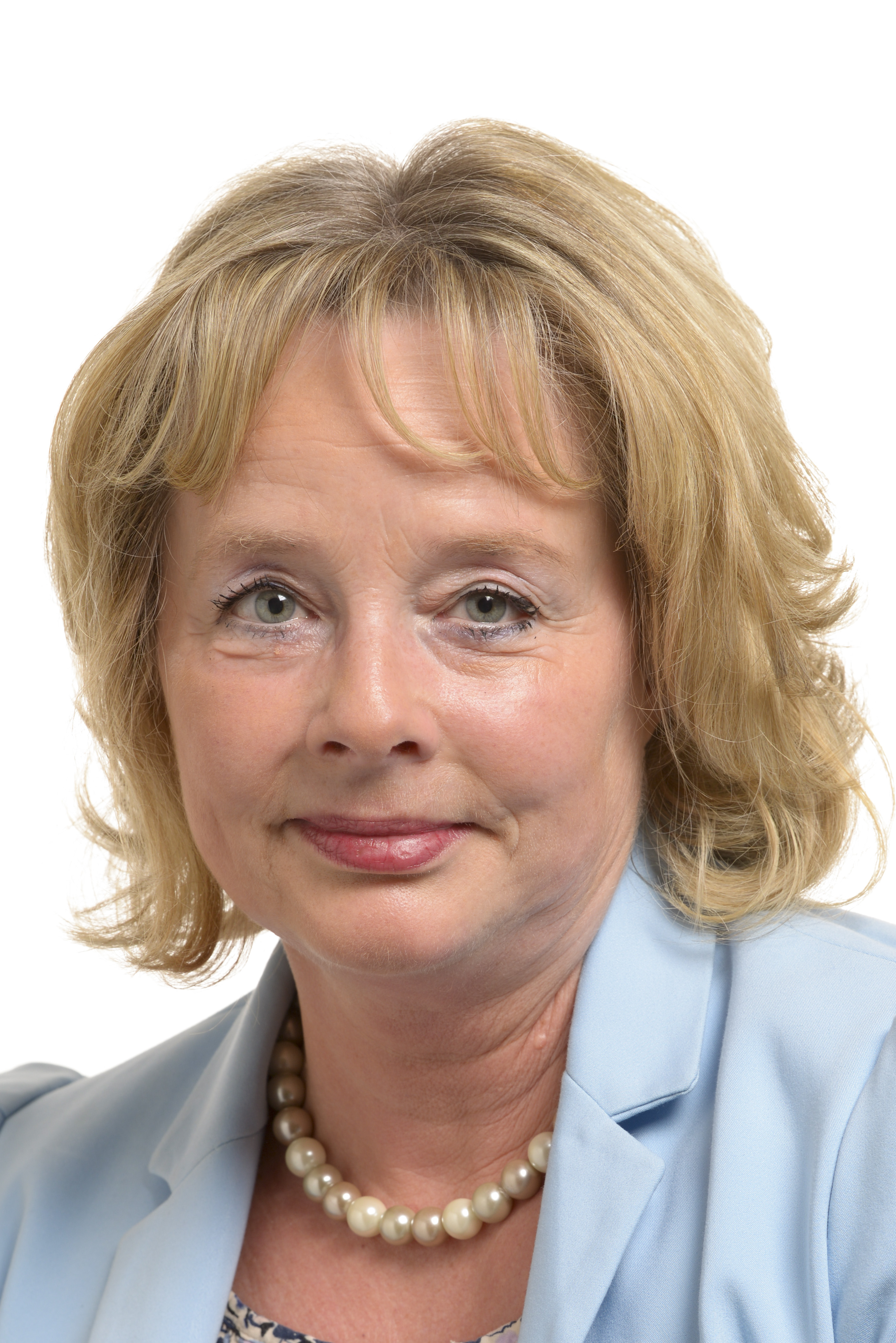
- Childers in 2014

Member of the European Parliament
- In office 1 July 2014 – 24 May 2019
- Constituency: Dublin
- In office 1 July 2009 – 24 May 2014
- Constituency: East

Personal details
- Born: 9 October 1956 (age 69) Castleknock, Dublin, Ireland
- Party: Independent
- Other political affiliations: Labour Party (1992–2004, 2008–2013); Green Party (2004–2008)
- Spouse: Ross Skelton (m. 1980)
- Children: 2
- Parents: Erskine H. Childers (father); Rita Childers (mother)
- Relatives: Robert Caesar Childers (great-grandfather); Erskine Childers (grandfather); Molly Childers (grandmother); Erskine Barton Childers (half-brother)
- Education: Trinity College Dublin; University College Dublin
- Website: nessachilders.ie

Nessa Maria Vereker Childers (born 9 October 1956) is an Irish former independent politician who served as a Member of the European Parliament (MEP) from 2009 to 2019.

== Early life ==
She is the daughter of the fourth President of Ireland, Erskine H. Childers and his second wife, Rita Childers. Her paternal grandfather was Erskine Childers, a leading Irish republican and author of the espionage thriller The Riddle of the Sands. She has an Arts and Psychology degree from Trinity College Dublin and a postgraduate diploma from University College Dublin. During her time at Trinity she served as Registrar of the University Philosophical Society. She previously worked as a psychoanalyst in private practice.

== Politics ==
She is a former County councillor for the Green Party, representing the Blackrock local electoral area on Dún Laoghaire–Rathdown County Council. She was elected in 2004 and resigned from her seat in August 2008.

Childers originally joined the Labour Party before the 2004 local elections, but when she failed to get a nomination to run for Dún LaoghaireRathdown County Council, she switched to the Green Party and was elected to represent it as a Councillor.

In September 2008, she resigned from the Green Party to run for the Labour Party in the East constituency at the 2009 European Parliament election. She was elected in May 2009.

Between 2009 and 2014, Childers was a member of the European Parliament's Committee on the Environment, Public Health and Food Safety and the delegation for relations with Japan. She was also a substitute member of the Committee on Culture and Education.

In November 2011, she refused to support the Irish Government's nominee to the European Court of Auditors, Kevin Cardiff. who was head of the Financial Services Division of the Department of Finance. Childers said she had concerns about his suitability given the uncertainty around his role in the Irish Bank Guarantee and a recent serious error in the calculation of the Irish public finances.

Childers campaigned unsuccessfully to have former Fianna Fáil TD, Minister and European Commissioner Pádraig Flynn, stripped of his Commission pension after the Mahon Tribunal, which found him to have received corrupt payments. The reason the Commission gave was that the findings "do not represent the verdict of a court after due process".

She resigned from the Parliamentary Labour Party on 5 April 2013, saying "..I no longer want to support a Government that is actually hurting people". She resigned from the Labour Party itself in July 2013. She was a non-attached MEP from 2013 to 2014.

In June 2013, she called upon Minister Phil Hogan to convene a commission to decide on new constituency boundaries. She noted a reduction in European Parliamentary seats allocated to Irish constituencies, which had fallen from 12 to 11 as a consequence of the accession of Croatia to the European Union. She further called for a ban on the placement of election posters on local council-owned poles, but not on the more common eircom poles or Electric Ireland poles. The commission was appointed in July 2013.

In January 2014, Childers announced that she would switch from the East constituency to the Dublin constituency at the 2014 European Parliament election. For the 2014 election the East constituency was abolished with the northern part transferred to the new Midlands–North-West constituency, and the southern part transferred to the South constituency.

Childers was elected for the Dublin constituency at the 2014 European election. On 18 June 2014, she was re-admitted to the Progressive Alliance of Socialists and Democrats (S&D). In 2017, Childers stated she would not contest the 2019 European Parliament elections.

Childers is a member of the Advisory Panel of Democracy in Europe Movement 2025.

== See also ==
- Families in the Oireachtas
