= Mrs. Fiske Warren (Gretchen Osgood) and Her Daughter Rachel =

Painting by John Singer Sargent

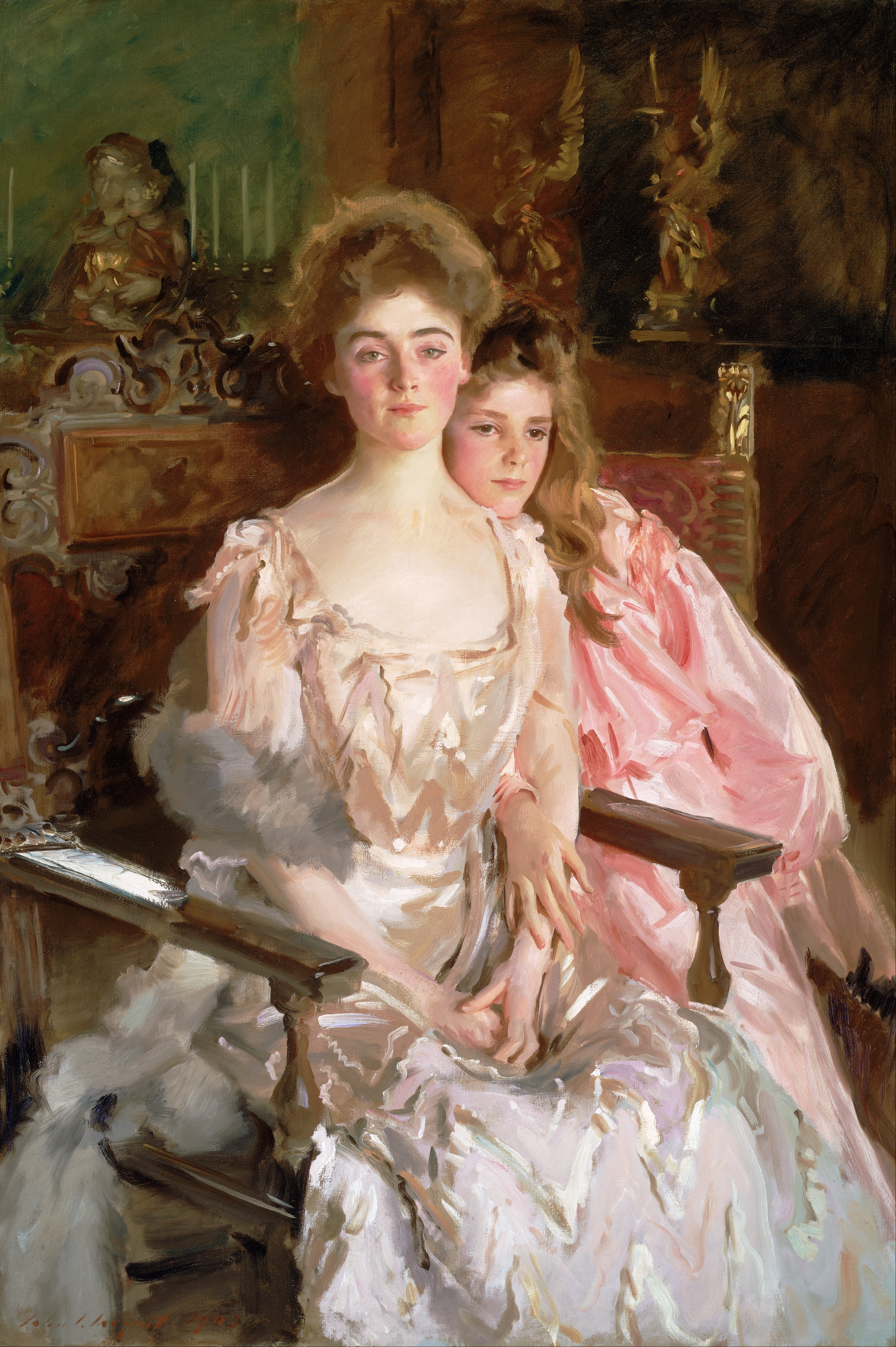
- Artist: John Singer Sargent
- Year: 1903
- Medium: Oil on canvas
- Dimensions: 152.4 cm × 102.55 cm (60.0 in × 40.37 in)
- Location: Museum of Fine Arts, Boston, Massachusetts

Mrs. Fiske Warren (Gretchen Osgood) and Her Daughter Rachel is a 1903 oil on canvas portrait painting by American portrait painter John Singer Sargent of Gretchen Osgood Warren, an American actress, singer, and poet, and her daughter Rachel Warren. The painting measures at 152.4 × 102.55 cm (60.0 × 40.4 in) and is exhibited at the Museum of Fine Arts in Boston, Massachusetts. The museum acquired it on 13 May 1964.

== Background ==
Margaret Gretchen Osgood Warren was born in 1871 to an affluent family in the historic neighborhood of Beacon Hill, Boston, Massachusetts. Because of her family's wealth, she could easily pursue music and drama. She attended the Paris Conservatory, studying under Gabriel Fauré as a mezzo-soprano.

She married into another affluent Beacon Hill family when she became the wife of paper manufacturer Fiske Warren on 14 May 1891.

In April 1903, Fiske Warren commissioned the famous American portraitist John Singer Sargent to paint Gretchen and their daughter. The sitting was done in Fenway Court, then the home of Boston philanthropist and American art collector Isabella Stewart Gardner, whose immense collection would become the Isabella Stewart Gardner Museum that same year.

== Description ==
Gretchen Warren is seen seated in an Italian early baroque style chair with her daughter Rachel Warren. Sargent attempted to emulate aristocratic poses while using a modern and confident approach to the brush strokes.

== See also ==
- List of works by John Singer Sargent
