= Gretchen Osgood Warren =

American actress, singer, and poet (1868–1961)

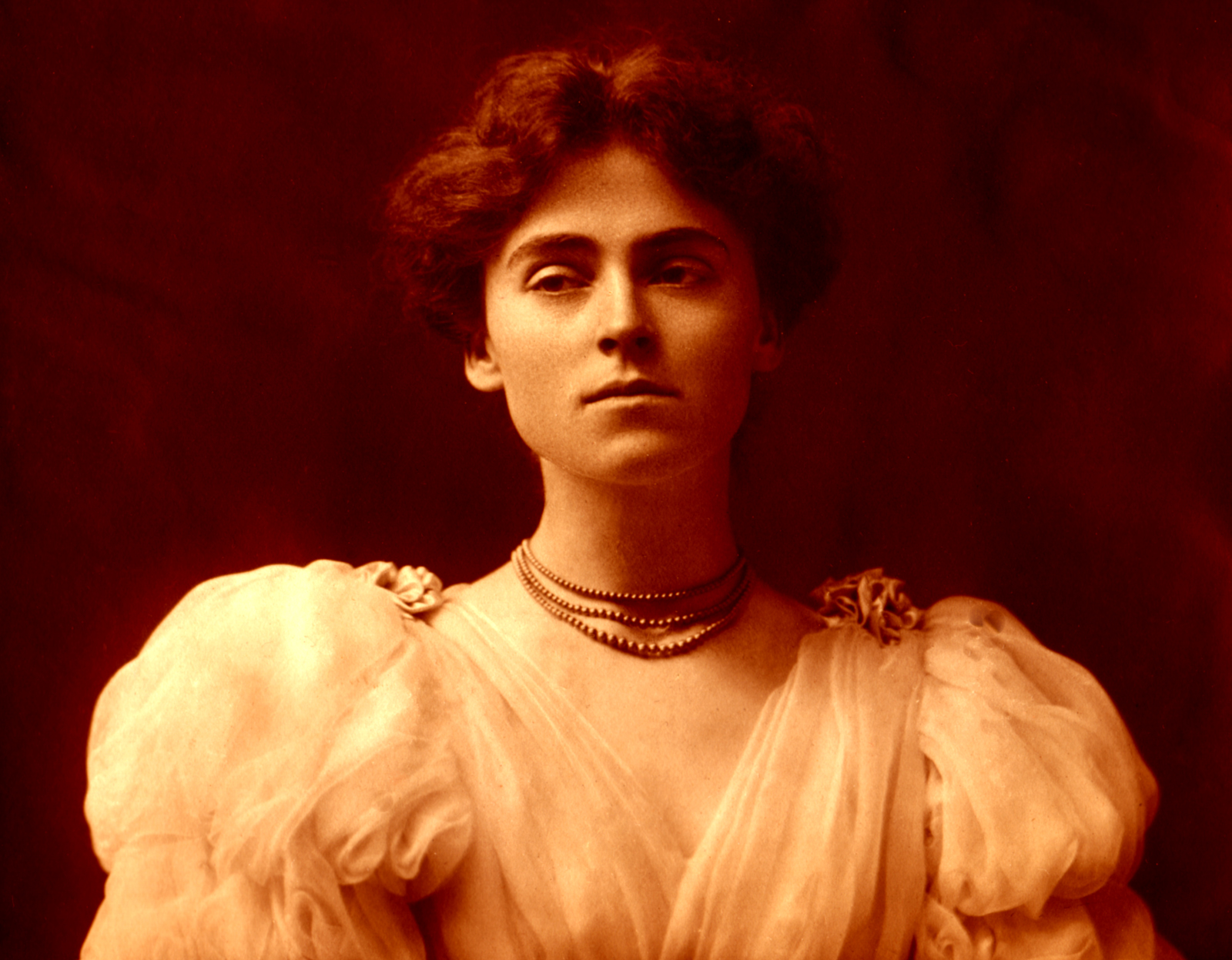
- Born: Margaret Gretchen Osgood; March 19, 1871; Chelsea, Massachusetts, U.S.
- Died: September 13, 1961 (aged 90); Boston, Massachusetts, U.S.
- Occupations: Actress; singer; poet
- Spouse: Fiske Warren
- Relatives: Molly Childers (sister); Erskine Hamilton Childers (nephew); Samuel Kirkland Lothrop (son-in-law); Robert Childers Barton (son-in-law)

Gretchen Osgood Warren (March 19, 1871 – September 13, 1961) was an American actress, singer, and poet. She was the wife of Fiske Warren and the daughter of Dr. Hamilton Osgood and Margaret Cushing Osgood of Beacon Hill, Boston, Massachusetts. Her younger sister was Mary Alden Childers, the wife of writer and Irish nationalist Erskine Childers. Her nephew Erskine Hamilton Childers served as the fourth President of Ireland from 1973 to 1974.

== Early life ==
She could sing perfectly in pitch, write like an adult and recite poetry on command. Her upbringing in the affluent environment that was turn of the century Beacon Hill, Boston, Massachusetts allowed her to pursue music and drama to a high level.

Just down the street from the Osgood home was the Boston Athenaeum, where a long line of Osgoods, namely Frances Sargent Osgood and Samuel Stillman Osgood, are all listed on the "Register of the Proprietors" for the institution. Gretchen went on to study philosophy at the University of Oxford and graduated with honors.

== Artistic muse ==
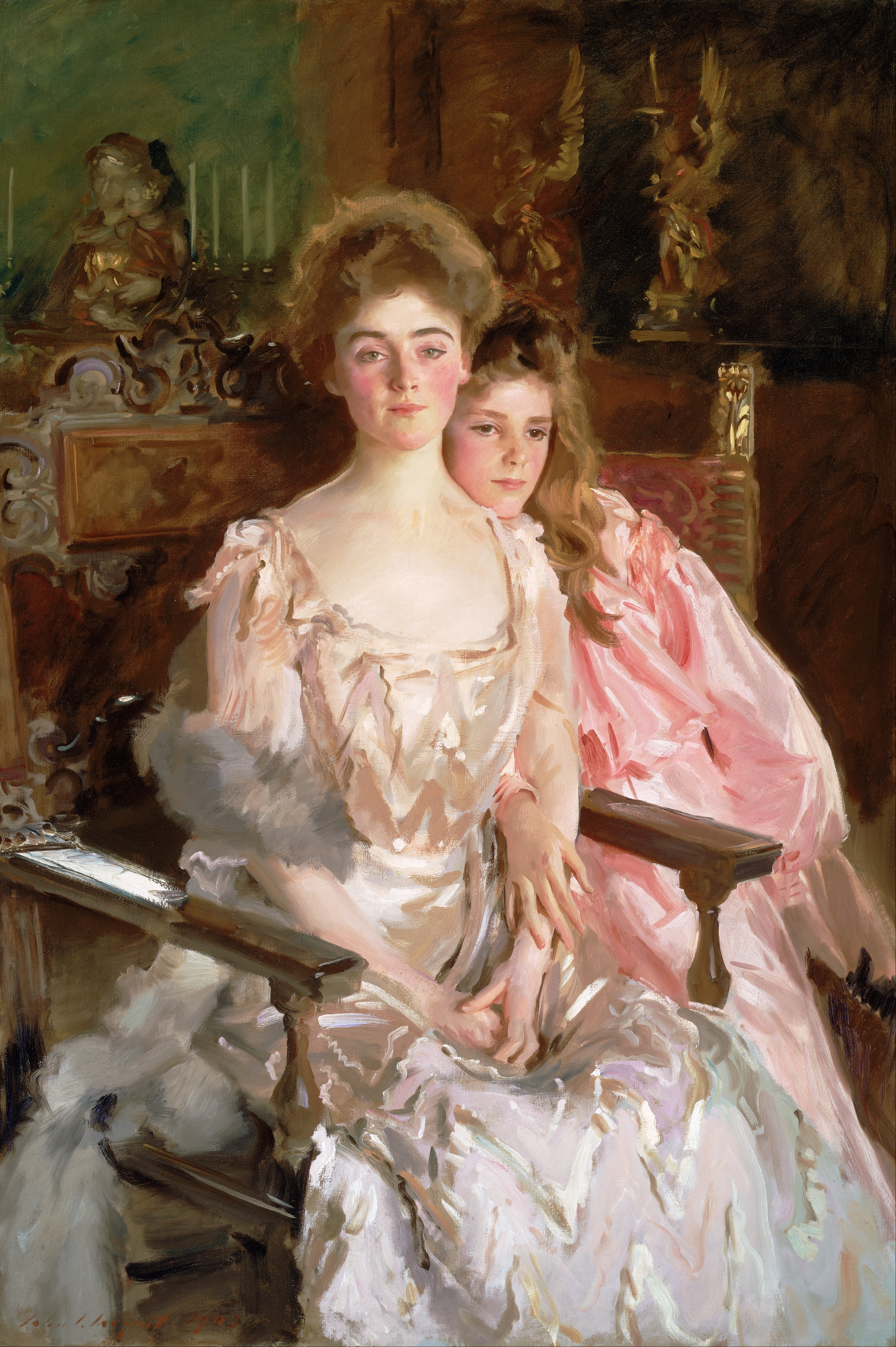
Mrs. Fiske Warren (Gretchen Osgood) and Her Daughter Rachel, John Singer Sargent, 1903.

John Singer Sargent, the famed portraitist of Boston's elite, was commissioned by Warren's husband, Fiske Warren to paint her portrait in April 1903. The sitting was done in Fenway Court, then the home of legendary Boston fine arts patron Isabella Stewart Gardner. Warren is seen seated in a chair with her daughter, Rachel Warren. The painting is often considered to be one of Sargent's prime portraits and often appears in Sargent Estate calendars and postcards. Later she was also photographed by portrait photographer Arnold Genthe.

She died at her home in Boston in 1961. Her daughter Rachel married the American archaeologist Samuel K. Lothrop and later the Irish nationalist Robert Childers Barton.Her son, Hamilton Warren, founded Verde Valley School in Sedona, Arizona.

== Awards ==
- Golden Rose Award

== Works ==
- Warren, G. O. “A Philosophical Aspect of Science,” The Monist, Vol. 20, No. 2 (April 1910), pp. 217–230.
- "The Pilgrim's Way". Poet lore. Writer's Center. 1915.
- Harriet Monroe, ed. (1916). "The Wild Bird". Poetry. Modern Poetry Association.
- Warren, G. O. Trackless Regions: Poems. Oxford: Blackwell, 1917.
- Warren, G. O. The Sword: Poems. Oxford: Blackwell, 1919.
- Warren, Gretchen. Art, Nature, Education: Aurea Apprehensio. Cambridge, Mass.: Fogg Museum of Art, 1943.
- Warren, Gretchen. Humanity: Twenty-Six Poems. Oxford: Blackwell, 1953.
- Warren, Gretchen. Two Essays: Art, Nature, Education: Aurea Apprehensio; and The Husbandry of the Spirit. Oxford: Blackwell, 1955.

== Sources ==
- The Mount Vernon Street Warrens, Martin Green, Simon & Schuster, 1989 ISBN 0-684-19109-1
- Birth: "Massachusetts, State Vital Records, 1638-1927", FamilySearch (https://www.familysearch.org/ark:/61903/1:1:FXZY-HGS : Wed May 22 22:07:10 UTC 2024), Margaret Osgood, 19 Mar 1871; "Massachusetts, Town Clerk, Vital and Town Records, 1626-2001", FamilySearch (https://www.familysearch.org/ark:/61903/1:1:FH5S-J5S : Mon Mar 11 00:39:10 UTC 2024), Margaret Osgood, 19 March 1871.
- "Obituary for Gretchen O. Warren." The Boston Globe. 1961-09-15. p. 25. Retrieved 2025-09-16.
- Museum of Fine Arts, Boston
