= Robert Caesar Childers =

British Orientalist (1838–1876)

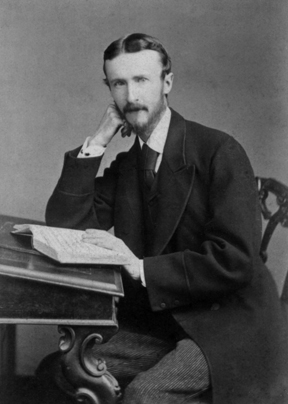
- Born: 1838; Cantley, South Yorkshire, England
- Died: 25 July 1876 (aged 38); Weybridge or London, England
- Resting place: Highgate Cemetery
- Education: Wadham College, Oxford
- Known for: A Dictionary of the Pali Language (1875)
- Spouse: Anna Mary Henrietta Barton
- Children: 5, including Erskine Childers
- Relatives: Erskine Hamilton Childers (grandson); Erskine Barton Childers (great-grandson); Nessa Childers (great-granddaughter)
- Awards: Prix Volney (1876)

Robert Caesar Childers (/ˈtʃɪldərz/; 1838 – 25 July 1876) was a British Orientalist and the compiler of the first Pali–English dictionary to be published. He was the father of the Irish nationalist Erskine Childers and the paternal grandfather of the fourth president of Ireland, Erskine Hamilton Childers.

== Life ==
=== Early years ===
Childers was born in 1838 in Cantley, South Yorkshire, the son of Reverend Charles Childers, an English chaplain in Nice.

In 1857, at the age of nineteen, he was admitted to Wadham College, Oxford, where he studied Hebrew.

=== Ceylon ===
From 1860 to 1864, Childers was employed by the civil service in Ceylon, first as private secretary to the governor, Charles Justin MacCarthy, and then as office assistant to the government agent in Kandy.

During his time in Ceylon, he studied Sinhala and Pali with Ven. Yātrāmulle Śrī Dhammārāma Thera at Bentota Vanavāsa Vihāra, and established a firm friendship with Ven. Waskaḍuwe Śrī Subhūti.

His time there was brought to an end when ill health forced him to return to England.

=== Pali dictionary ===
Upon his return to England, Childers continued his study of Pali, influenced by Reinhold Rost and Viggo Fausböll.

In 1870, he published the text of the Khuddaka Pāṭha with an English translation and notes in the Journal of the Royal Asiatic Society. This was the first Pali text ever printed in England.

The first volume of his Pali dictionary was published in 1872. In the autumn of that year, he was appointed sub-librarian at the India Office under Reinhold Rost, and early in the following year became the first professor of Pali and Buddhist literature at University College, London.

The second and concluding volume was published in 1875. A few months later, the dictionary was awarded the Prix Volney for 1876 by the Institut de France.

=== Family ===
Childers was married to Anna Mary Henrietta Barton, who came from an Anglo-Irish family with an estate in Glendalough, County Wicklow. Childers and his wife had five children (two sons and three daughters).

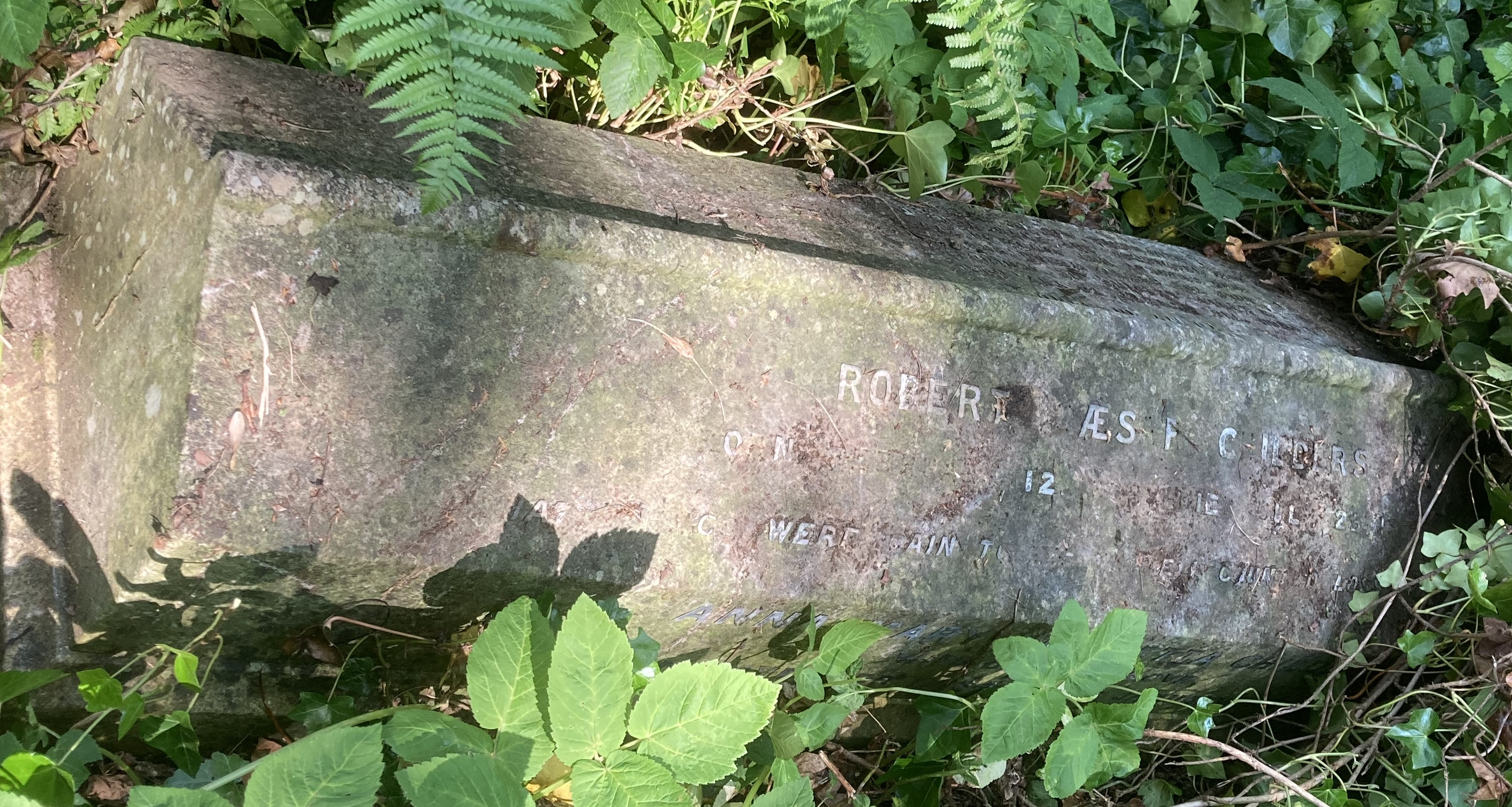
Childers's grave in Highgate Cemetery

=== Death ===
Childers died from tuberculosis on 25 July 1876, at the age of thirty-eight. Thomas William Rhys Davids states in the Dictionary of National Biography that Childers died in Weybridge, but the Encyclopædia Britannica records his place of death as London.

== Notable works ==
=== Papers ===
- Childers, R. C. (1870). "Khuddaka Páṭha, a Páli Text, with a Translation and Notes". Journal of the Royal Asiatic Society. 4 (2): 309–339. doi:10.1017/S0035869X00016002. JSTOR 25207679.
- Childers, R. C. (1871). "Notes on Dhammapada, with Special Reference to the Question of Nirvâṇa". Journal of the Royal Asiatic Society. 5 (2): 219–230. doi:10.1017/S0035869X00161246. JSTOR 44012782.
- Childers, R. C. (1875). "Notes on the Sinhalese Language. No. I. On the Formation of the Plural of Neuter Nouns". Journal of the Royal Asiatic Society. 7 (1): 35–48. doi:10.1017/S0035869X0001635X. JSTOR 25207694.
- Childers, R. C. (1875). "The Pali Text of the Mahâparinibbâna Sutta and Commentary, with a Translation". Journal of the Royal Asiatic Society. 7 (1): 49–80. doi:10.1017/S0035869X00016361. JSTOR 25207695.
- Childers, R. C. (1876). "DAKKH in Pali". Beiträge zur vergleichenden Sprachforschung auf dem Gebiete der arischen, celtischen und slawischen Sprachen. 8 (2): 150–155. JSTOR 23458831.
- Childers, R. C. (1876). "Notes on the Sinhalese Language. No. II. Proofs of the Sanskritic Origin of Sinhalese". Journal of the Royal Asiatic Society. 8 (1): 131–155. doi:10.1017/S0035869X00016646. JSTOR 25207724.
- Childers, R. C. (1876). "The Pali Text of the Mahâparinibbâna Sutta and Commentary, with a Translation (Continued from Vol. VII. N.S. p. 80)". Journal of the Royal Asiatic Society. 8 (2): 219–261. doi:10.1017/S0035869X00016683. JSTOR 25207729.
- Childers, R. C. (1879). "On Sandhi in Pali". Journal of the Royal Asiatic Society. 11 (1): 99–121. doi:10.1017/S0035869X00017184. JSTOR 25196820.
- Vijasinha, L. Comrilla; Childers, R. C. (1871). "On the Origin of the Buddhist Arthakathás". Journal of the Royal Asiatic Society. 5 (2): 289–302. doi:10.1017/S0035869X0016126X. JSTOR 44012784.

=== Books ===
- Childers, R. C. (1875). A Dictionary of the Pali Language. London: Trübner & Co.
