= Mallica Vajrathon =

Thai United Nations official (born 1936)

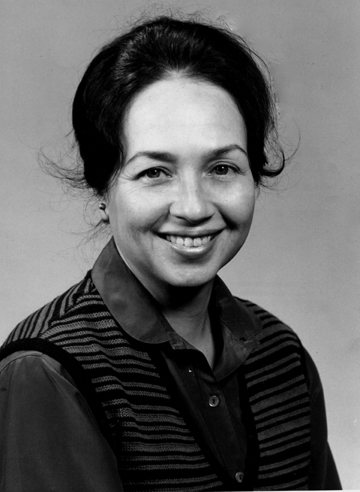
Mallica Vajrathon

Mallica Vajrathon (born 1936) is a sociologist, political scientist and former United Nations Senior Staff member. Her grandfather was Joseph Caulfield James, a special tutor to Prince Vajiravudh of Thailand (who later became King), as well being second Chairman of the Royal Bangkok Sports Club. Her father was T. Vajrathon of The Bangkok Electric Authority of Thailand and her mother is Malee James Vajrathon. Vajrathon was married to Irish writer Erskine B. Childers.

== Early life ==
Born in Bangkok, she is the eldest daughter of a large multi-cultural family. She went to grade school at Mater Dei School run by the Ursulines. She continued her studies at Chulalongkorn University of Bangkok, Southern Illinois University, the Sorbonne and Cornell. As an alumna, Vajrathon has received numerous awards and honors. Among them, the Saint Angela Award for Outstanding Service to the Community, 2002, from Mater Dei Institute and the Outstanding Graduate Award in International Affairs, 1989 from Chulalongkorn University.

== United Nations Civil Service ==
She is one of the highest-ranking United Nations civil servants from Thailand. With more than 32 years of service, she began her UN career as an intern at the organization's headquarters in New York City, US. In 1960, upon returning to Thailand, Vajrathon was recruited by UNICEF. In 1968, she worked with Erskine B. Childers in a "pioneering" project in Development Support Communication. During her work for UNICEF in Thailand and Indonesia, she was asked to take numerous photographs which were published in two books by Judith Spiegelman. In 1975, she returned to New York to work in UNFPA as a communications officer with Rafael M. Salas. In the early 1980s, Vajrathon was asked to contribute to the Thailand section of the now famous book, the International Women's Movement Anthology: Sisterhood is Global by Robin Morgan. Known to be an outspoken advocate of women's rights, she was the editor of Equal Time, a publication of the group on equal rights for women in the United Nations.

Vajrathon was selected by the Secretary General of the Fourth World Conference on Women to be Principal Advisor for the preparation of the conference from 1993-1995.
