= Erskine Barton Childers =

Irish writer and correspondent (1929–1996)

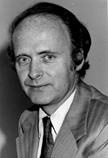
- Born: 11 March 1929; Dublin, Ireland
- Died: 25 August 1996 (aged 67); Luxembourg City, Luxembourg
- Resting place: Roundwood, County Wicklow, Ireland
- Education: Newtown School, Waterford
- Alma mater: Trinity College Dublin; Stanford University
- Spouses: Sonia Baker (divorced); Mallica Vatrathon (m. 1970)
- Children: 3
- Father: Erskine Hamilton Childers
- Relatives: Robert Caesar Childers (great-grandfather); Erskine Childers (grandfather); Molly Childers (grandmother); Nessa Childers (half-sister)

Erskine Barton Childers (11 March 1929 – 25 August 1996) was an Irish writer, BBC correspondent and United Nations senior civil servant.

== Early life and family ==
Childers was born in Dublin to Erskine Hamilton Childers (Ireland's fourth President) and his first wife Ruth Ellen Dow. His grandparents Molly Childers and Robert Erskine Childers and the latter's double first cousin Robert Barton were all Irish nationalists involved heavily with the negotiation of Irish independence; which ultimately led to his grandfather's execution during the Irish Civil War. His great-aunt was Gretchen Osgood Warren.

He grew up in a multicultural atmosphere which was to influence his whole life. From an early age, he had an obvious fascination with history and world affairs. He studied at Newtown School, Waterford and much later on at Trinity College Dublin, and Stanford University. At Stanford, he was actively involved with the National Student Association and rose to Vice-president of the organisation by 1949.

== BBC and the Arab world ==
By 1960, Childers was in London working for the BBC in both radio and television. His broadcasts from the BBC World Service ranged on varying topics from the Suez Crisis and Palestine to the assassination of John F. Kennedy in 1963. He was one of the first presenters at the start of the BBC TV show The Money Programme in 1966. The Suez Canal and Palestine issues would later form the basis of his writing on the subjects.

He was distinguished as one of the first mainstream writers in the West to systematically challenge the contention that Palestinian Arab refugees of the 1947–1948 civil war in Mandatory Palestine and the 1948 Arab–Israeli War (see 1948 Palestinian expulsion and flight) fled their homes primarily from Arab broadcast evacuation orders (see Broadcasts for Christopher Hitchens' article about same), rather than from the use of force and terror by armed forces of the newly forming state of Israel.

== United Nations civil servant ==
He specialised in UN issues, even serving as a periodic consultant including a special mission in the Congo for Secretary-General U Thant. In 1967, under the leadership of Henry Richardson Labouisse Jr.; Childers was hired to lead a United Nations, UNICEF & UNDP programme called Development Support Communication; or DSCS. In 1968, Childers co-authored a paper with United Nations colleague Mallica Vajrathon called "Project Support Communication", later published in an important anthology about social change. In this paper he wrote,

If you want development to be rooted in the human beings who have to become the agent of it as well as the beneficiaries, who will alone decide on the kind of development they can sustain after the foreign aid has gone away, then you have got to communicate with them, you have got to enable them to communicate with each other and back to the planners in the capital city. You have got to communicate the techniques that they need in order that they will decide on their own development. If you do not do that, you will continue to have weak or failing development programs. It's as simple as that. No innovation, however brilliantly designed and set down in a project plan of operations, becomes development until it has been communicated.

From 1975 to 1988, Childers was based in New York as Director of Information for UNDP. By his retirement in 1989 as Senior Advisor to the UN Director General for Development and International Economic Co-operation, after 22 years of service; Childers had worked with most of the organisations of the UN system, at all levels and in all regions.

== Ford Foundation and the Dag Hammarskjöld Foundation ==
After his retirement, Childers continued to work for his ideals. He co-wrote books for the Ford Foundation and the Dag Hammarskjöld Foundation on the reform of the United Nations with his colleague United Nations civil servant, Sir Brian Urquhart. The best known of these publications is A World in Need of Leadership. He continued writing on United Nations matters whilst travelling constantly; lecturing on the Organisation and the many challenges confronting it, such as globalisation and democracy, conflict prevention and peace-keeping, humanitarian assistance, human rights, famine, ageing and development, health, financial arrangement of the United Nations, citizen's rights, female participation, design and perceptions, education, the North-South divide and world economy. In 1995, Childers co-wrote a paper with his international law colleague Marjolijn Snippe called "The Agenda for Peace and the Law of the Sea", for Pacem in Maribus XXIII, the Annual Conference of the International Ocean Institute, which was held in Costa Rica, December 1995.

He became Secretary General of the World Federation of United Nations Associations in March 1996. He served for only five months, and died on 25 August 1996 during the organisation's fiftieth anniversary congress. He is buried in Roundwood, County Wicklow, Ireland.
