= Erskine Hamilton Childers =

President of Ireland from 1973 to 1974

- Childers in 1971

President of Ireland
- In office 25 June 1973 – 17 November 1974
- Taoiseach: Liam Cosgrave
- Preceded by: Éamon de Valera
- Succeeded by: Cearbhall Ó Dálaigh

Tánaiste
- In office 2 July 1969 – 14 March 1973
- Taoiseach: Jack Lynch
- Preceded by: Frank Aiken
- Succeeded by: Brendan Corish

Minister for Health
- In office 2 July 1969 – 14 March 1973
- Taoiseach: Jack Lynch
- Preceded by: Seán Flanagan
- Succeeded by: Brendan Corish

Minister for Transport and Power
- In office 27 June 1959 – 2 July 1969
- Taoiseach: Seán Lemass; Jack Lynch
- Preceded by: Office created
- Succeeded by: Brian Lenihan

Minister for Posts and Telegraphs
- In office 10 November 1966 – 2 July 1969
- Taoiseach: Jack Lynch
- Preceded by: Joseph Brennan
- Succeeded by: Patrick Lalor
- In office 13 June 1951 – 2 June 1954
- Taoiseach: Éamon de Valera
- Preceded by: James Everett
- Succeeded by: Michael Keyes

Minister for Lands
- In office 27 March 1957 – 23 July 1959
- Taoiseach: Éamon de Valera
- Preceded by: Mícheál Ó Móráin
- Succeeded by: Joseph Blowick

Parliamentary Secretary
- 1944–1948: Local Government and Public Health

Teachta Dála
- In office October 1961 – 23 June 1973
- Constituency: Monaghan
- In office February 1948 – October 1961
- Constituency: Longford–Westmeath
- In office June 1938 – February 1948
- Constituency: Athlone–Longford

Personal details
- Born: 11 December 1905 Westminster, London, England
- Died: 17 November 1974 (aged 68) Phibsborough, Dublin, Ireland
- Cause of death: Heart failure
- Resting place: Roundwood, County Wicklow, Ireland
- Party: Fianna Fáil
- Spouses: Ruth Ellen Dow (m. 1925; died 1950) Rita Dudley (m. 1952)
- Children: 7, including Erskine Barton and Nessa
- Parents: Robert Erskine Childers; Molly Alden
- Relatives: Robert Caesar Childers (paternal grandfather); Gretchen Osgood Warren (aunt)
- Education: Gresham's School; Trinity College, Cambridge
- Profession: Journalist; company director
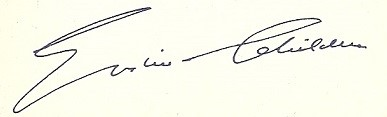
- Signature

Erskine Hamilton Childers (11 December 1905 – 17 November 1974) was an Irish Fianna Fáil politician who served as the president of Ireland from June 1973 to November 1974. He is the only Irish president to have died in office. He also served as Tánaiste and Minister for Health from 1969 to 1973, Minister for Transport and Power from 1959 to 1969, Minister for Posts and Telegraphs from 1951 to 1954 and 1966 to 1969, Minister for Lands from 1957 to 1959 and Parliamentary Secretary to the Minister for Local Government and Public Health from 1944 to 1948. He served as a Teachta Dála (TD) from 1938 to 1973.

His father Robert Erskine Childers, an Irish republican and author of the espionage thriller The Riddle of the Sands, was executed during the Irish Civil War.

== Early life ==
Childers was born in the Embankment Gardens, Westminster, London, to a Protestant family, originally from Glendalough, County Wicklow, Ireland. Although also born in England, his father, Robert Erskine Childers, had an Irish mother and had been raised by an uncle in County Wicklow, and after World War I took his family to live there. His mother, Molly Childers, was a Bostonian whose ancestors arrived on the Mayflower. Robert and Molly later emerged as prominent and outspoken Irish republican opponents of the political settlement with Britain which resulted in the establishment of the Irish Free State.

Childers was educated at Gresham's School, Holt. In 1922 when Childers was sixteen, his father was executed by the new Irish Free State on politically inspired charges of gun-possession. The pistol he had been found with had been given to him by Michael Collins. Before his execution, in a spirit of reconciliation, the elder Childers obtained a promise from his son to seek out and shake the hand of every man who had signed his death warrant.

After attending his father's funeral, Childers returned to Gresham's, then two years later he attended Trinity College, Cambridge where he studied history.

== Career ==
After finishing his education, Childers worked for a period for a tourism board in Paris. In 1931, Éamon de Valera invited him to work for de Valera's recently founded newspaper The Irish Press in Dublin, where Childers became advertising manager. He became a naturalised Irish citizen in 1938. That same year, he was elected as a Fianna Fáil TD for the constituency of Athlone–Longford. He remained a member of Dáil Éireann until 1973 when he resigned to become President of Ireland.

When former President of Ireland Douglas Hyde, who was a Protestant, died in 1949, most senior politicians did not attend the funeral service inside St. Patrick's Cathedral; rather, they remained outside. The exceptions were Noël Browne, the Minister for Health, and Childers, a fellow Protestant.

Childers joined the cabinet in 1951, as Minister for Posts and Telegraphs in the de Valera government. He then served as Minister for Lands in de Valera's 1957–59 cabinet. In 1959, the new Taoiseach Seán Lemass initially appointed him as Minister for Lands, before appointing him to the newly created position of Minister for Transport and Power. He served in that position until 1969, in combination with his former position of Minister for Posts and Telegraphs from 1966 under Jack Lynch. In 1969, he was appointed as Tánaiste and Minister for Health in 1969.

He never held any of the most important Cabinet posts and his ministerial career was described by one Handbook of Irish politics as "spectacularly unsuccessful". Others praised his willingness to make tough decisions. He was outspoken in his opposition to Charles Haughey, in the aftermath of the Arms Crisis, when Haughey and Neil Blaney, having been both removed from the government, were sent for trial amid allegations of a plot to import arms for the Provisional IRA. (Both were acquitted.)

== President of Ireland ==
=== Campaign ===
In the 1966 presidential election, Fine Gael TD Tom O'Higgins had come within 11,000 votes (1%) of defeating de Valera; at the 1973 election he was again the Fine Gael nominee and was widely expected to win. Childers was nominated by Fianna Fáil at the behest of de Valera, who pressured Jack Lynch in the selection of the presidential candidate. On the campaign trail, his popularity proved enormous, and in a political upset, Childers was elected the fourth President of Ireland on 30 May 1973, defeating O'Higgins by 635,867 (52%) votes to 578,771 (48%).

=== Presidency ===
When Childers was inaugurated as President of Ireland, he took the oath of office in the Irish language, but this was with some reluctance, as he spoke relatively little of it. As his very distinctive Oxbridge accent made pronouncing Irish difficult, he used a tape recording obtained from a native speaker in West Cork to help his pronunciation, during a stay near Sneem on the coast of County Kerry.

Childers, though 67, quickly gained a reputation as a vibrant, extremely hard-working President, and became highly popular and respected. However, he had a strained relationship with the incumbent government, led by Taoiseach Liam Cosgrave of Fine Gael. Childers had campaigned on a platform of making the presidency more open and hands-on, which Cosgrave viewed as a threat to his agenda as head of government. He refused to cooperate with Childers's priority upon taking office, the establishment of a think tank within Áras an Uachtaráin, to plan the country's future. Childers considered resigning from the presidency but was convinced to remain by Cosgrave's Foreign Minister, Garret FitzGerald. However, Childers remained detached from the government; whereas previously, Presidents had been briefed by the Taoiseach once a month, Cosgrave briefed President Childers and his successor, Cearbhall Ó Dálaigh, on average once every six months.

Though frustrated about the lack of power he had in the office, Childers's daughter Nessa believes that he played an important behind-the-scenes role in easing the Northern Ireland conflict, reporting that former Prime Minister of Northern Ireland Terence O'Neill met secretly with her father at Áras an Uachtaráin on at least one occasion.

=== Death ===
Prevented from transforming the presidency as he desired, Childers instead threw his energy into a busy schedule of official visits and speeches, which was physically taxing.

On 17 November 1974, during a conference with the psychiatrists of the Royal College of Physicians in Dublin, Childers suffered sudden heart failure causing him to lie sideways and turn blue before suddenly collapsing. He was pronounced dead the same day at Mater Misericordiae University Hospital.

Childers's state funeral in St. Patrick's Cathedral, Dublin, was attended by his presidential predecessor Éamon de Valera and world leaders including the Earl Mountbatten of Burma (representing Queen Elizabeth II), the British Prime Minister Harold Wilson and British Opposition Leader Edward Heath, and heads of state from Europe and beyond. He was buried on the grounds of the Church of Ireland Derralossary Church, in Roundwood, County Wicklow.

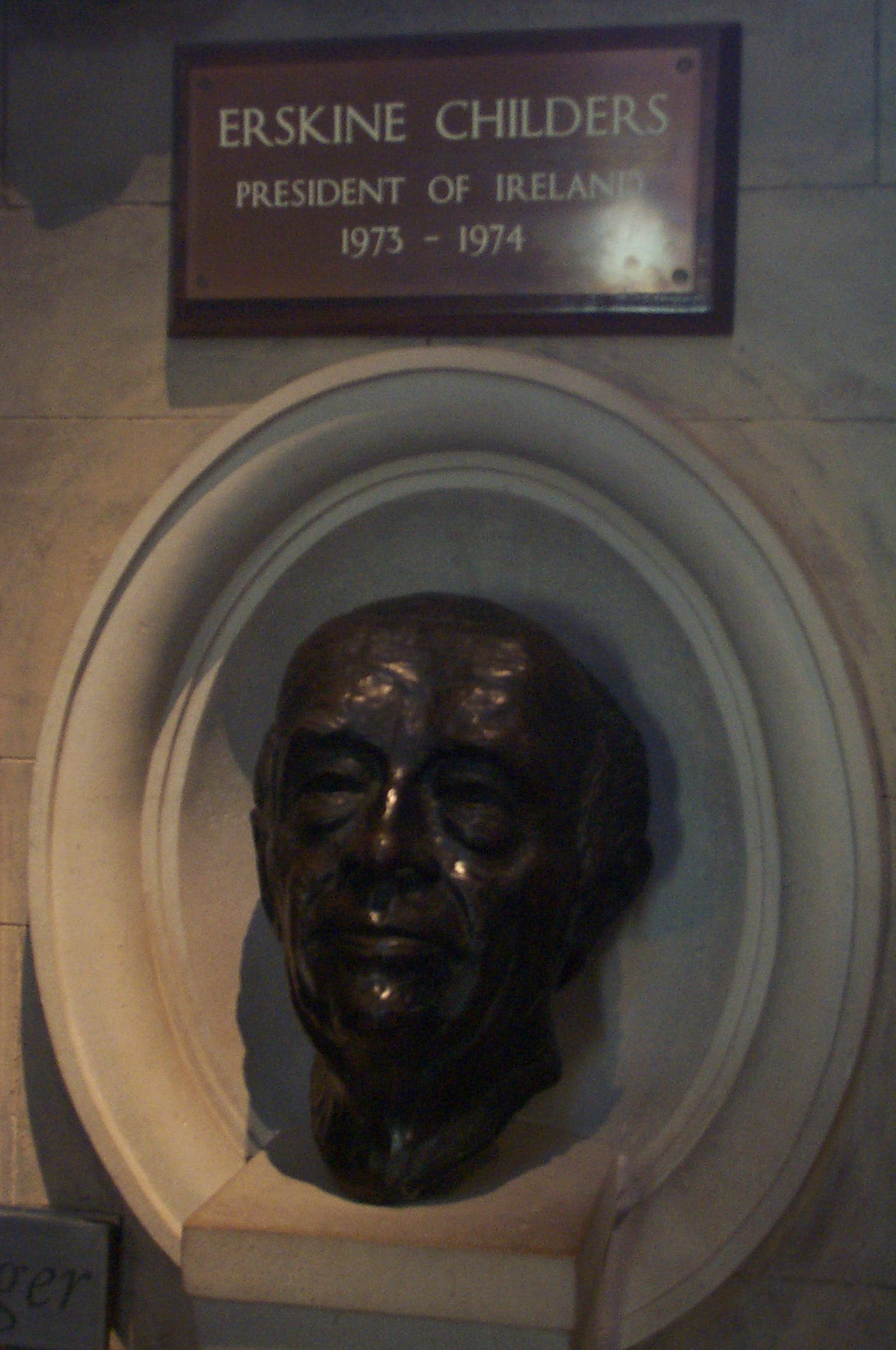
Memorial to Erskine Childers in St. Patrick's Cathedral sculpted by James Power

Erskine Childers's grave in Derralossary Church grounds, Roundwood, County Wicklow, Ireland

Close up view of Erskine Childers's grave in Derralossary Church grounds, Roundwood, County Wicklow, Ireland

== Succession ==
Childers's widow, Rita Childers, shared her late husband's widespread personal popularity. Upon his death, when she issued a press statement pleading for the nation to keep the office above politics in choosing a successor, Cosgrave reacted by suggesting to the Opposition Leader, Jack Lynch, that they appoint Mrs. Childers to the presidency by acclamation. Lynch agreed four days after Childers's death to bring the suggestion to his party. However, when members of Cosgrave's Fine Gael disclosed the plan to the press on their initiative, Lynch, believing his Fianna Fáil party was being denied a public voice in the decision, withdrew his support for her.

All parties instead agreed to nominate the former Attorney General and Chief Justice, Cearbhall Ó Dálaigh, as Childers's successor, who was elected unopposed.

== Family ==
Childers married Ruth Ellen Dow in 1925. They had five children, Ruth Ellen Childers, born in July 1927, Erskine, born in March 1929, followed by Roderick Winthrop Childers in June 1931, and, in November 1937, twin daughters, Carainn and Margaret Osgood Childers.

After the death of Dow in 1950, Childers married again, in 1952, to Rita Dudley, a Catholic. Together they had a daughter, Nessa, who is a former Member of the European Parliament and County Councillor.

Childers was survived by children from both his marriages. His second wife Rita Dudley died on 9 May 2010.

== See also ==
- List of people on the postage stamps of Ireland

Political offices
| New office | Parliamentary Secretary to the Minister for Local Government and Public Health; 1944–1948 | Office abolished |
| Preceded by James Everett | Minister for Posts and Telegraphs; 1951–1954 | Succeeded by Michael Keyes |
| Preceded by Joseph Blowick | Minister for Lands; 1957–1959 | Succeeded by Mícheál Ó Móráin |
| New office | Minister for Transport and Power; 1959–1969 | Succeeded by Brian Lenihan |
| Preceded by Joseph Brennan | Minister for Posts and Telegraphs; 1966–1969 | Succeeded by Patrick Lalor |
| Preceded by Frank Aiken | Tánaiste; 1969–1973 | Succeeded by Brendan Corish |
| Preceded by Seán Flanagan | Minister for Health; 1969–1973 | Succeeded by Brendan Corish |
| Preceded by Éamon de Valera | President of Ireland; 1973–1974 | Succeeded by Cearbhall Ó Dálaigh |

| Dáil | Election | Deputy (Party) | Deputy (Party) | Deputy (Party) |
|---|---|---|---|---|
| 9th | 1937 | Matthew Davis (FF) | James Victory (FF) | Seán Mac Eoin (FG) |
| 10th | 1938 | Erskine H. Childers (FF) | James Victory (FF) | Seán Mac Eoin (FG) |
| 11th | 1943 | Erskine H. Childers (FF) | Thomas Carter (FF) | Seán Mac Eoin (FG) |
| 12th | 1944 | Erskine H. Childers (FF) | Thomas Carter (FF) | Seán Mac Eoin (FG) |
| 13th | 1948 | Constituency abolished. See Longford–Westmeath | | |

| Dáil | Election | Deputy (Party) | Deputy (Party) | Deputy (Party) | Deputy (Party) | Deputy (Party) |
|---|---|---|---|---|---|---|
| 2nd | 1921 | Lorcan Robbins (SF) | Seán Mac Eoin (SF) | Joseph McGuinness (SF) | Laurence Ginnell (SF) | 4 seats 1921–1923 |
| 3rd | 1922 | John Lyons (Lab) | Seán Mac Eoin (PT-SF) | Francis McGuinness (PT-SF) | Laurence Ginnell (AT-SF) | 4 seats 1921–1923 |
| 4th | 1923 | John Lyons (Ind.) | Conor Byrne (Rep) | James Killane (Rep) | Patrick Shaw (CnaG) | Patrick McKenna (FP) |
| 5th | 1927 (Jun) | Henry Broderick (Lab) | Michael Kennedy (FF) | James Victory (FF) | Patrick Shaw (CnaG) | Hugh Garahan (FP) |
| 6th | 1927 (Sep) | Henry Broderick (Lab) | Michael Kennedy (FF) | James Killane (FF) | Patrick Shaw (CnaG) | Michael Connolly (CnaG) |
| 6th | 1930 by-election | Henry Broderick (Lab) | Michael Kennedy (FF) | James Geoghegan (FF) | Patrick Shaw (CnaG) | Michael Connolly (CnaG) |
| 7th | 1932 | Francis Gormley (FF) | Michael Kennedy (FF) | James Geoghegan (FF) | Patrick Shaw (CnaG) | Seán Mac Eoin (CnaG) |
| 8th | 1933 | James Victory (FF) | Michael Kennedy (FF) | James Geoghegan (FF) | Charles Fagan (NCP) | Seán Mac Eoin (CnaG) |
| 9th | 1937 | Constituency abolished. See Athlone–Longford and Meath–Westmeath | | | | |

| Dáil | Election | Deputy (Party) | Deputy (Party) | Deputy (Party) | Deputy (Party) | Deputy (Party) |
|---|---|---|---|---|---|---|
| 13th | 1948 | Erskine H. Childers (FF) | Thomas Carter (FF) | Michael Kennedy (FF) | Seán Mac Eoin (FG) | Charles Fagan (Ind.) |
| 14th | 1951 | Erskine H. Childers (FF) | Frank Carter (FF) | Michael Kennedy (FF) | Seán Mac Eoin (FG) | Charles Fagan (Ind.) |
| 15th | 1954 | Erskine H. Childers (FF) | Frank Carter (FF) | Michael Kennedy (FF) | Seán Mac Eoin (FG) | Charles Fagan (FG) |
| 16th | 1957 | Erskine H. Childers (FF) | Ruairí Ó Brádaigh (SF) | Michael Kennedy (FF) | Seán Mac Eoin (FG) | Charles Fagan (FG) |
| 17th | 1961 | Frank Carter (FF) | Joe Sheridan (Ind.) | Michael Kennedy (FF) | Seán Mac Eoin (FG) | 4 seats 1961–1992 |
| 18th | 1965 | Frank Carter (FF) | Joe Sheridan (Ind.) | Patrick Lenihan (FF) | Gerry L'Estrange (FG) | 4 seats 1961–1992 |
| 19th | 1969 | Frank Carter (FF) | Joe Sheridan (Ind.) | Patrick Lenihan (FF) | Gerry L'Estrange (FG) | 4 seats 1961–1992 |
| 19th | 1970 by-election | Frank Carter (FF) | Joe Sheridan (Ind.) | Patrick Cooney (FG) | Gerry L'Estrange (FG) | 4 seats 1961–1992 |
| 20th | 1973 | Frank Carter (FF) | Joe Sheridan (Ind.) | Patrick Cooney (FG) | Gerry L'Estrange (FG) | 4 seats 1961–1992 |
| 21st | 1977 | Albert Reynolds (FF) | Joe Sheridan (Ind.) | Seán Keegan (FF) | Gerry L'Estrange (FG) | 4 seats 1961–1992 |
| 22nd | 1981 | Albert Reynolds (FF) | Patrick Cooney (FG) | Seán Keegan (FF) | Gerry L'Estrange (FG) | 4 seats 1961–1992 |
| 23rd | 1982 (Feb) | Albert Reynolds (FF) | Patrick Cooney (FG) | Seán Keegan (FF) | Gerry L'Estrange (FG) | 4 seats 1961–1992 |
| 24th | 1982 (Nov) | Albert Reynolds (FF) | Patrick Cooney (FG) | Mary O'Rourke (FF) | Gerry L'Estrange (FG) | 4 seats 1961–1992 |
| 25th | 1987 | Albert Reynolds (FF) | Patrick Cooney (FG) | Mary O'Rourke (FF) | Henry Abbott (FF) | 4 seats 1961–1992 |
| 26th | 1989 | Albert Reynolds (FF) | Louis Belton (FG) | Mary O'Rourke (FF) | Paul McGrath (FG) | 4 seats 1961–1992 |
| 27th | 1992 | Constituency abolished. See Longford–Roscommon and Westmeath | | | | |

| Dáil | Election | Deputy (Party) | Deputy (Party) | Deputy (Party) | Deputy (Party) | Deputy (Party) |
|---|---|---|---|---|---|---|
| 30th | 2007 | Willie Penrose (Lab) | Peter Kelly (FF) | Mary O'Rourke (FF) | James Bannon (FG) | 4 seats 2007–2024 |
| 31st | 2011 | Willie Penrose (Lab) | Robert Troy (FF) | Nicky McFadden (FG) | James Bannon (FG) | 4 seats 2007–2024 |
| 31st | 2014 by-election | Willie Penrose (Lab) | Robert Troy (FF) | Gabrielle McFadden (FG) | James Bannon (FG) | 4 seats 2007–2024 |
| 32nd | 2016 | Willie Penrose (Lab) | Robert Troy (FF) | Kevin "Boxer" Moran (Ind.) | Peter Burke (FG) | 4 seats 2007–2024 |
| 33rd | 2020 | Sorca Clarke (SF) | Robert Troy (FF) | Joe Flaherty (FF) | Peter Burke (FG) | 4 seats 2007–2024 |
| 34th | 2024 | Sorca Clarke (SF) | Robert Troy (FF) | Kevin "Boxer" Moran (Ind.) | Peter Burke (FG) | Micheál Carrigy (FG) |

| Dáil | Election | Deputy (Party) | Deputy (Party) | Deputy (Party) |
|---|---|---|---|---|
| 2nd | 1921 | Seán MacEntee (SF) | Eoin O'Duffy (SF) | Ernest Blythe (SF) |
| 3rd | 1922 | Patrick MacCarvill (AT-SF) | Eoin O'Duffy (PT-SF) | Ernest Blythe (PT-SF) |
| 4th | 1923 | Patrick MacCarvill (Rep) | Patrick Duffy (CnaG) | Ernest Blythe (CnaG) |
| 5th | 1927 (Jun) | Patrick MacCarvill (FF) | Alexander Haslett (Ind.) | Ernest Blythe (CnaG) |
| 6th | 1927 (Sep) | Conn Ward (FF) | Alexander Haslett (Ind.) | Ernest Blythe (CnaG) |
| 7th | 1932 | Conn Ward (FF) | Eamon Rice (FF) | Ernest Blythe (CnaG) |
| 8th | 1933 | Conn Ward (FF) | Eamon Rice (FF) | Alexander Haslett (Ind.) |
| 9th | 1937 | Conn Ward (FF) | Eamon Rice (FF) | James Dillon (FG) |
| 10th | 1938 | Conn Ward (FF) | Bridget Rice (FF) | James Dillon (FG) |
| 11th | 1943 | Conn Ward (FF) | Bridget Rice (FF) | James Dillon (Ind.) |
| 12th | 1944 | Conn Ward (FF) | Bridget Rice (FF) | James Dillon (Ind.) |
| 13th | 1948 | Patrick Maguire (FF) | Bridget Rice (FF) | James Dillon (Ind.) |
| 14th | 1951 | Patrick Maguire (FF) | Bridget Rice (FF) | James Dillon (Ind.) |
| 15th | 1954 | Patrick Mooney (FF) | Edward Kelly (FF) | James Dillon (FG) |
| 16th | 1957 | Patrick Mooney (FF) | Eighneachán Ó hAnnluain (SF) | James Dillon (FG) |
| 17th | 1961 | Patrick Mooney (FF) | Erskine H. Childers (FF) | James Dillon (FG) |
| 18th | 1965 | Patrick Mooney (FF) | Erskine H. Childers (FF) | James Dillon (FG) |
| 19th | 1969 | Billy Fox (FG) | Erskine H. Childers (FF) | John Conlan (FG) |
| 20th | 1973 | Jimmy Leonard (FF) | Erskine H. Childers (FF) | John Conlan (FG) |
| 20th | 1973 by-election | Jimmy Leonard (FF) | Brendan Toal (FG) | John Conlan (FG) |
| 21st | 1977 | Constituency abolished. See Cavan–Monaghan | | |
