= River Medina =

Main river of the Isle of Wight, England

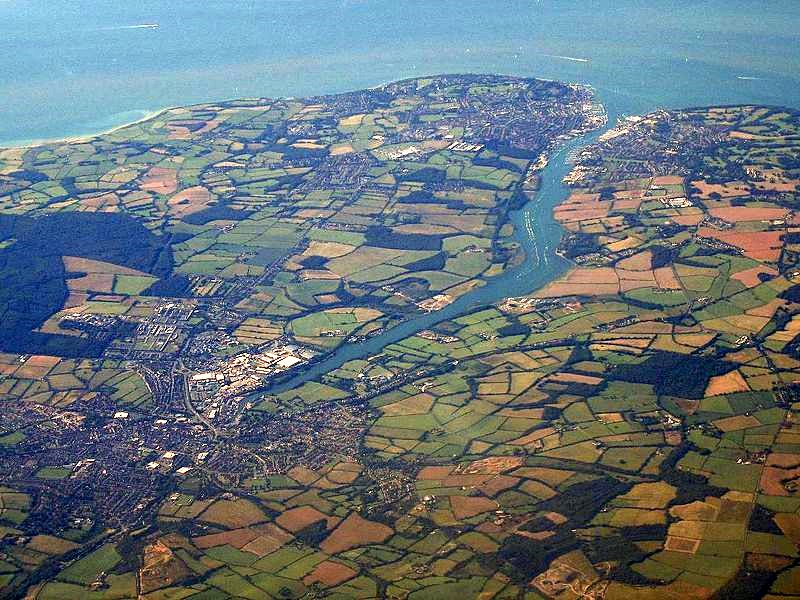
- The Medina estuary showing Newport and Cowes.

Physical characteristics
- Source
  - location: St Catherine's Down
- Mouth
  - location: Solent
- Length: 17 km (11 mi)

The River Medina is the main river of the Isle of Wight, England, rising at St Catherine's Down near Chale, and flowing northwards through the county town Newport, towards the Solent at Cowes. The river is a navigable tidal estuary from Newport northwards, where it takes the form of a ria (a drowned valley). This occurred because the Medina used to be a tributary of what was once the "River Solent", with a larger catchment area. As the Solent valley flooded, the river received less water and more sediment, causing it to become more tidal.

The river is bridged at Newport. Cowes is connected to East Cowes by a chain ferry known as the Cowes Floating Bridge. The river also has several small ferries which cater mainly for sailors.

The name Medina comes from the Old English Meðune meaning "the middle one", and the current pronunciation was first recorded as 'Medine' in 1196. The navigation of the river was improved in the nineteenth century by Henry Daniel Martin, a civil engineer who lived in Newport.

The river is used by yachtsmen as a safe harbour. Along its banks there are old warehouses and wharves, where in the past flying boats, hovercraft and steam ships were developed and built. The Classic Boat Museum displays much of the river's history, as well as the history of yachting. The Island Harbour Marina, at the site of an old tidal mill, is on the river about two miles from Newport.

== Views along the river ==
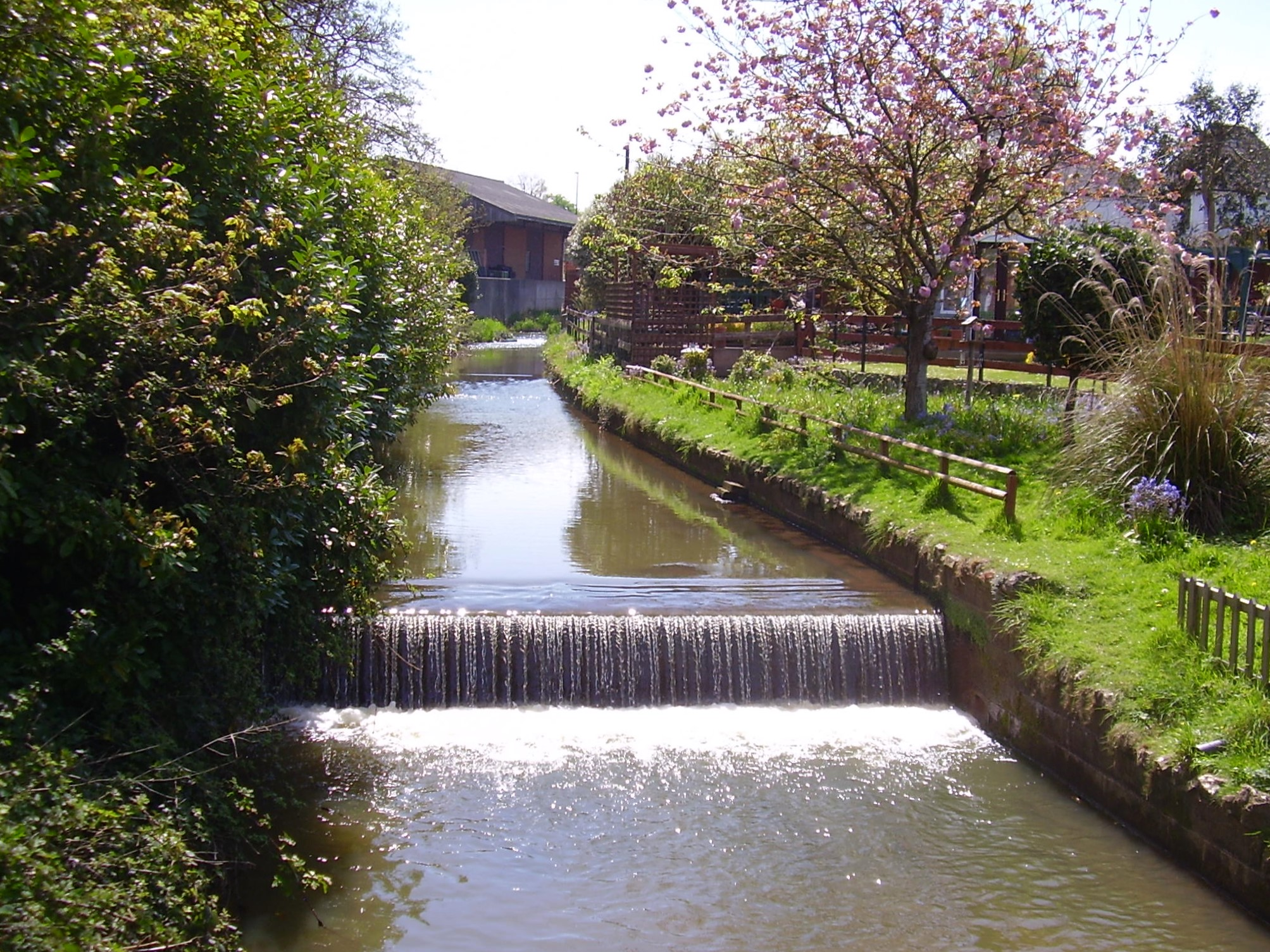
At Shide, on the southern outskirts of Newport

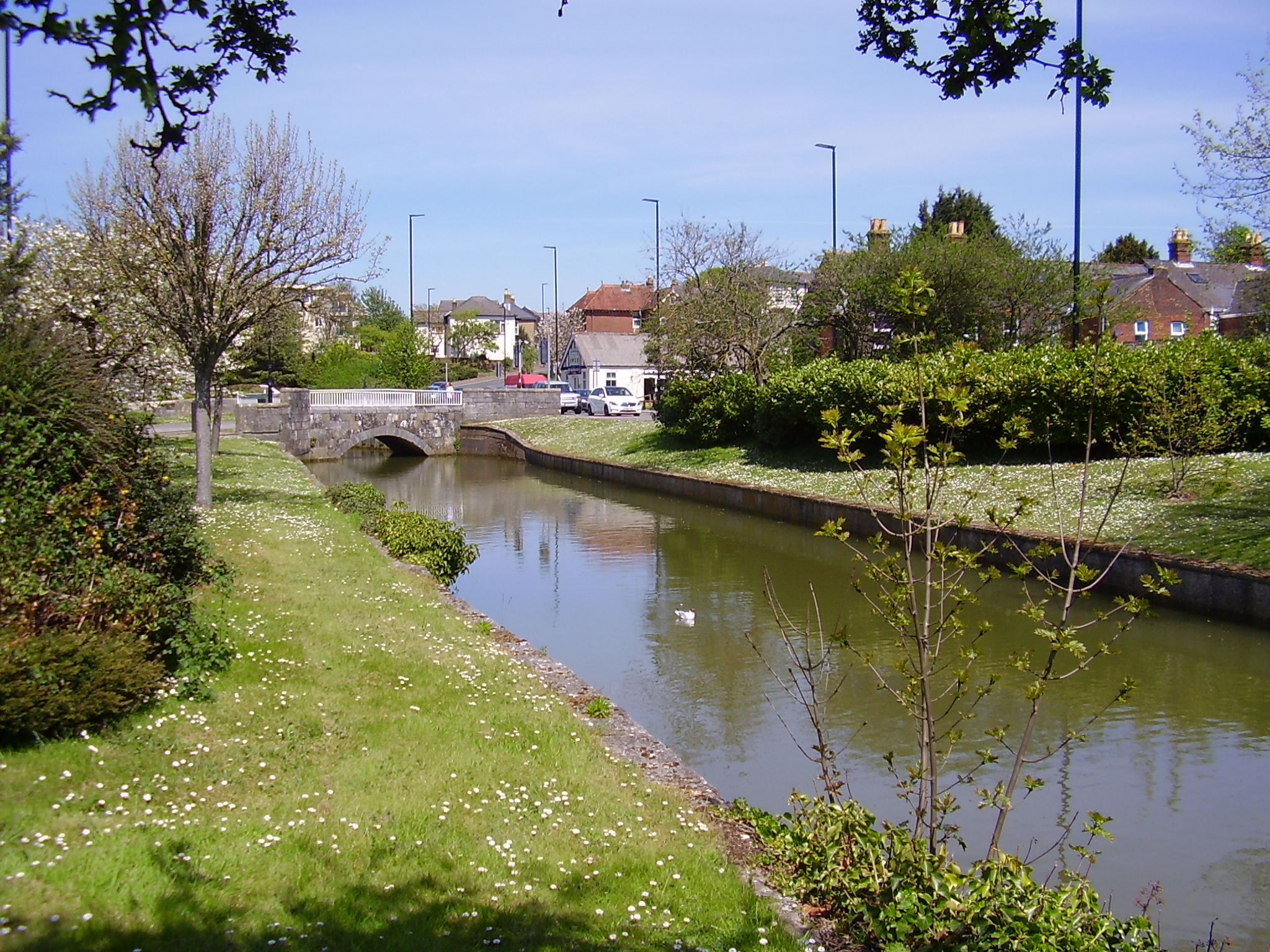
At Coppins Bridge, Newport

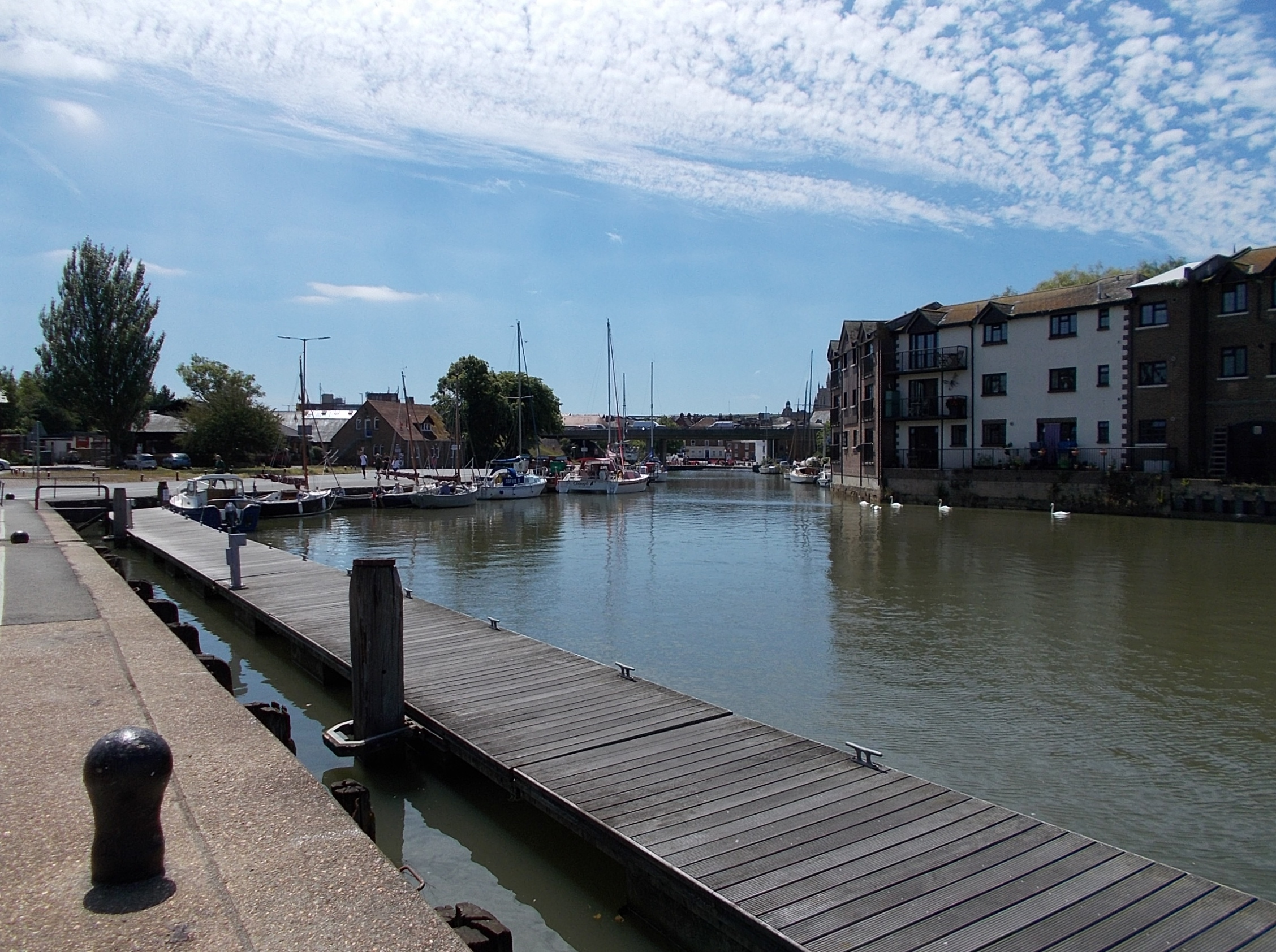
Newport Quay, at the head of the estuary

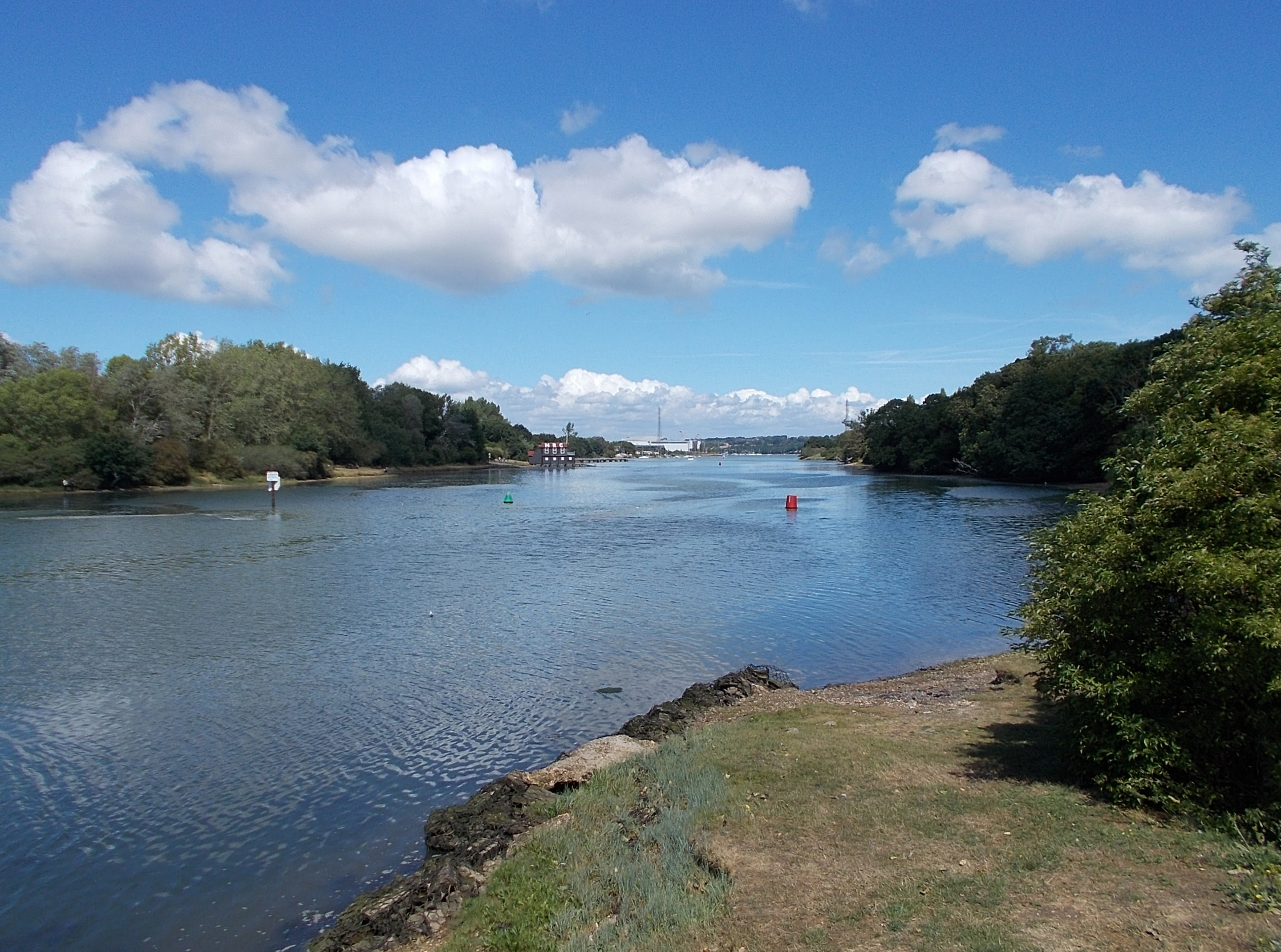
The estuary, looking north from Newport

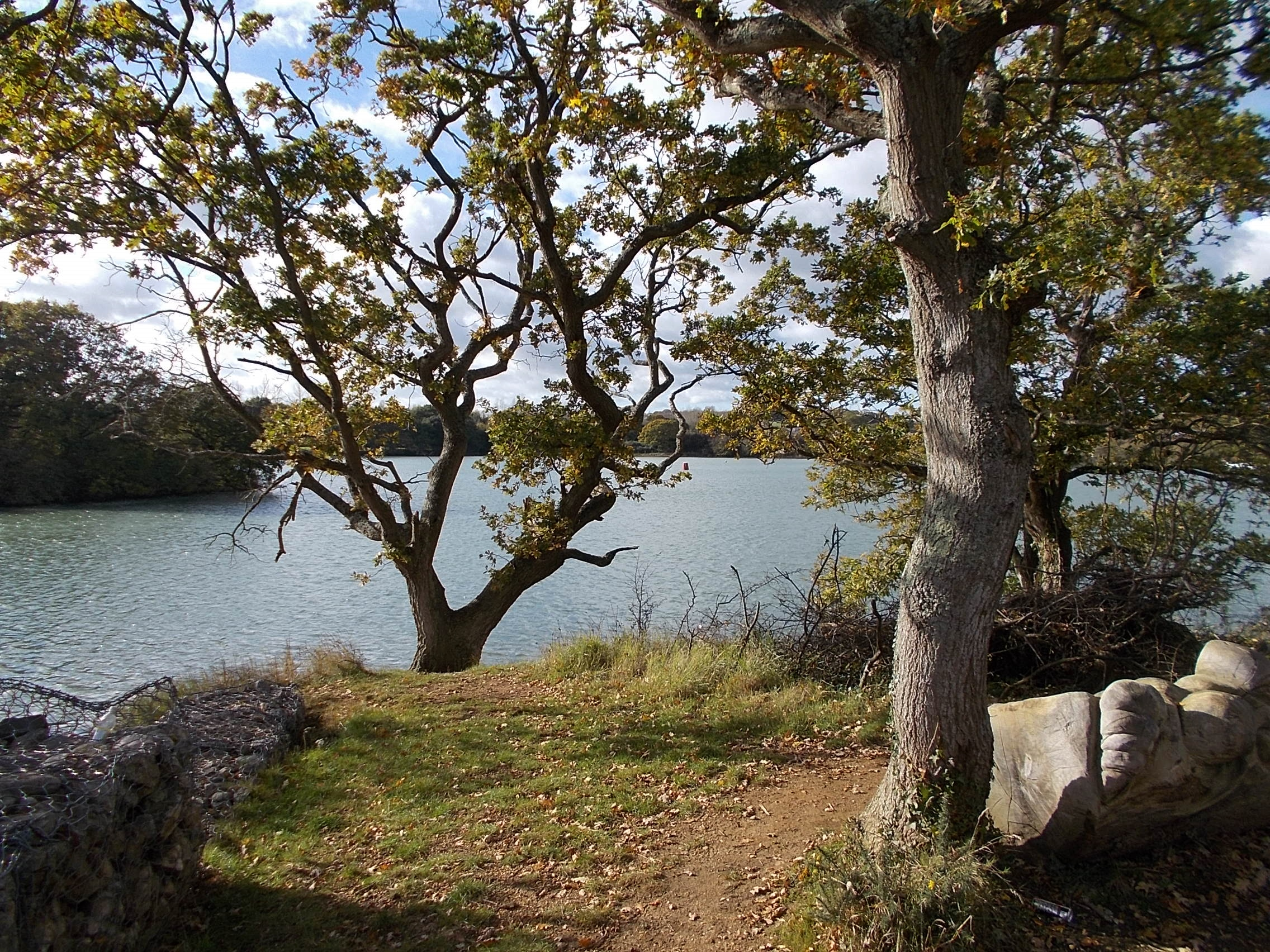
View from the east bank, about a mile north of Newport

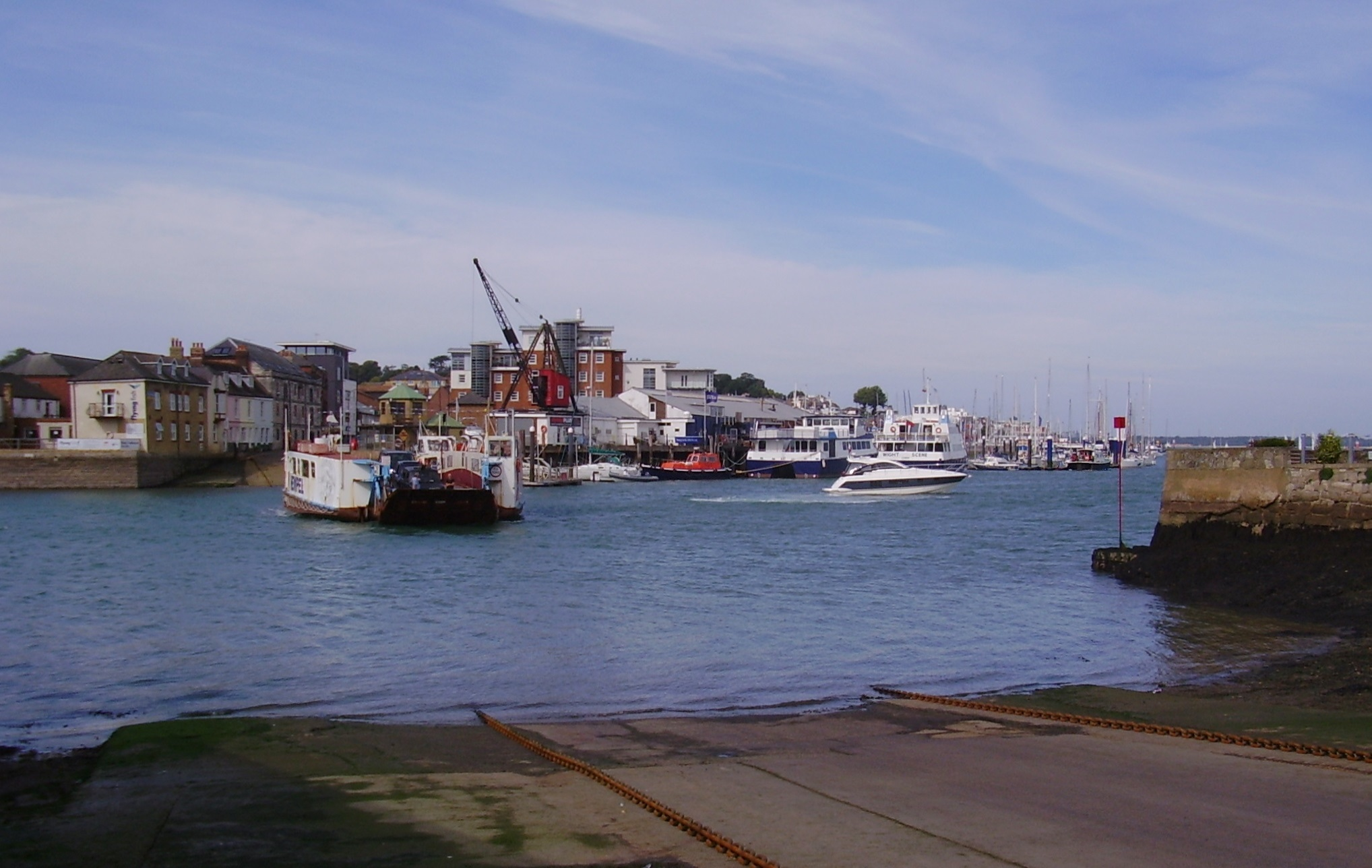
The river's mouth at Cowes, looking west, with the chain ferry in mid-stream

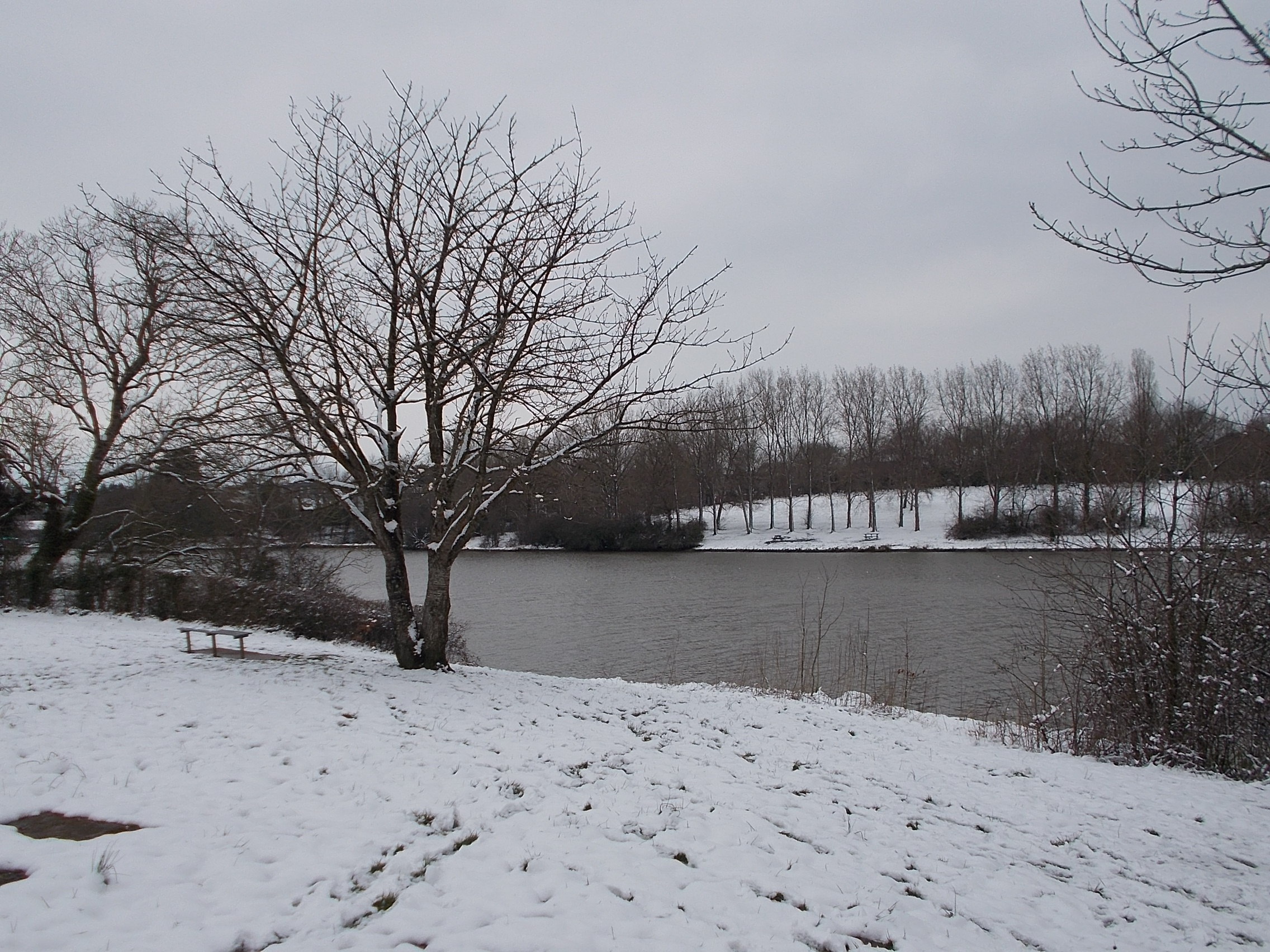
Wintry scene, near Newport. Snow here is fairly unusual.

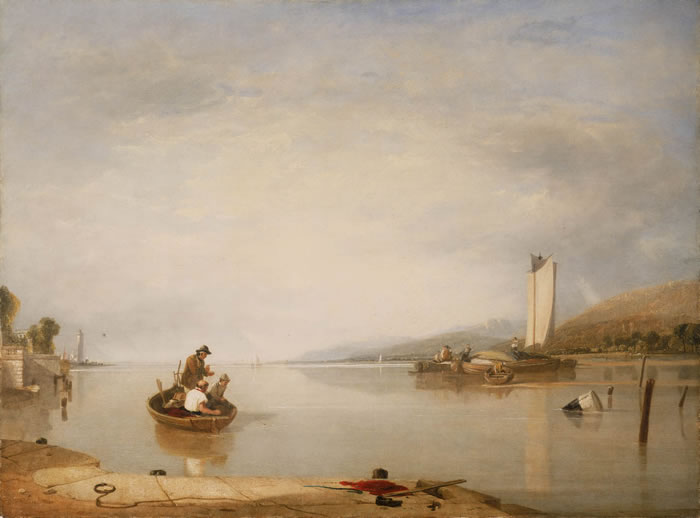
Dead Calm, a view of the Medina by Augustus Wall Callcott in 1827

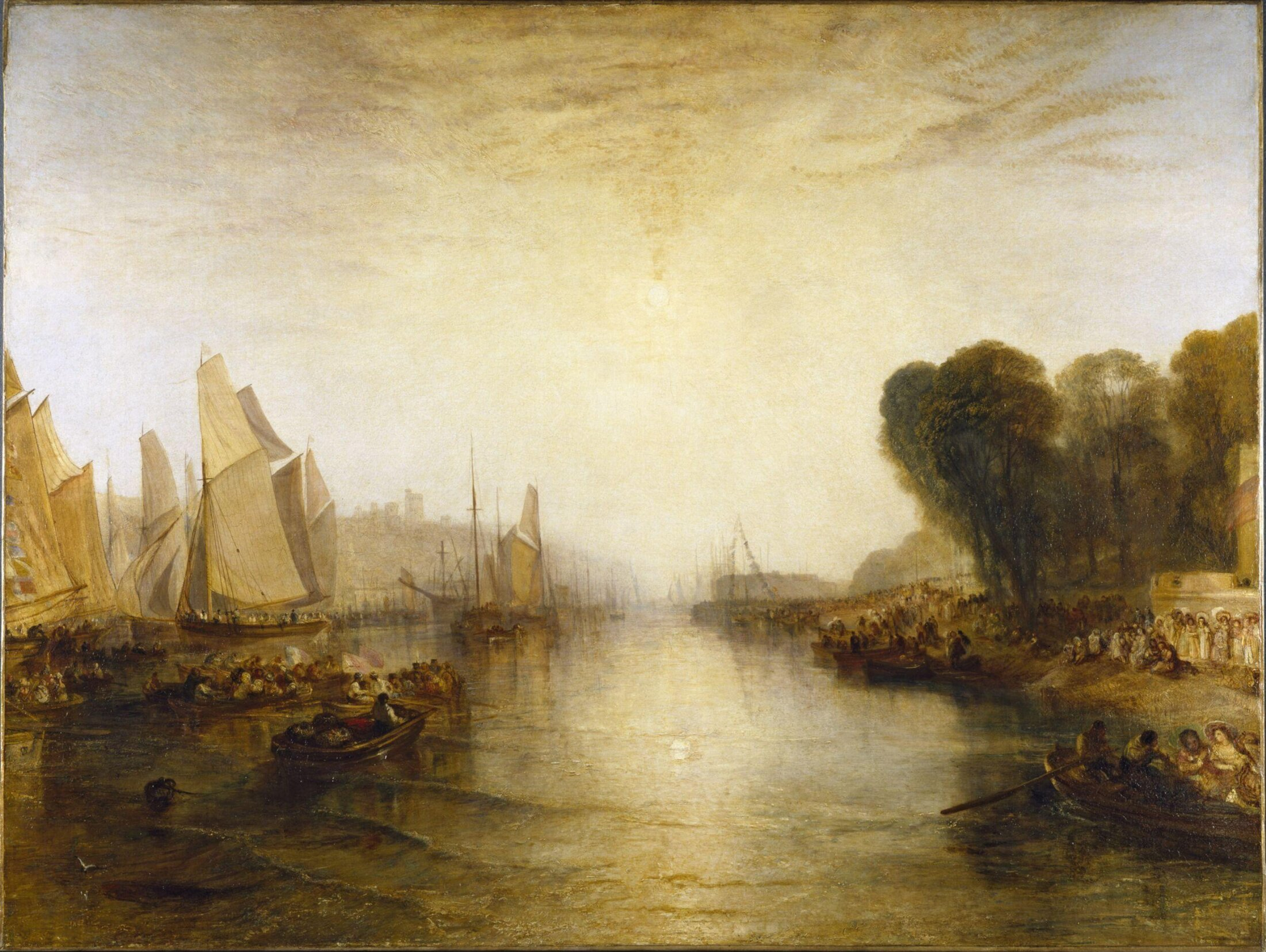
East Cowes Castle by Turner depicting the 1827 Cowes Regatta

== See also ==
- Rivers of the United Kingdom
