= Royal Adelaide (1834 ship) =

Royal yacht

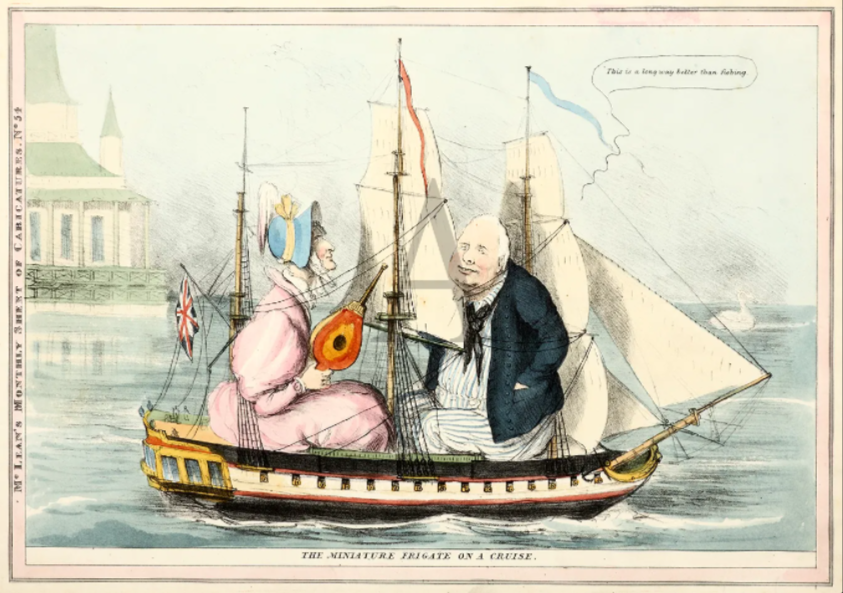
- A satirical cartoon depicting King William IV and Queen Adelaide sailing in the Royal Adelaide, circa 1834. The actual yacht was 50 feet (15 m) long.
- Designer(s): William Symonds
- Builder: John Fincham at Sheerness Dockyard
- Launched: 13 July 1834
- Owner(s): William IV of the United Kingdom
- Fate: Broken-up 1878

Specifications
- Type: Miniature frigate
- Displacement: 50 tons burthen
- Length: 50 ft (15 m)
- Beam: 15 ft (4.6 m)

Royal Adelaide was a royal yacht, designed as a miniature sailing frigate, which was built in 1833 and launched in the following year on the orders of King William IV of the United Kingdom, for use on Virginia Water Lake in Windsor Great Park in Surrey, England.

== History ==
The Royal Adelaide was a miniaturised version of the latest frigate, HMS Pique (1834) which had been designed by Sir William Symonds, the Chief Surveyor of the Navy. The Royal Adelaide was built at Sheerness Dockyard under the supervision of John Fincham, at a cost of £46 per ton. The yacht had been completed, disassembled and transported overland to Virginia Water by March 1834, where she was reassembled and launched in the presence of "many noblemen and gentlemen" on 13 July.

The Royal Adelaide was intended to train the king's young nephews in seamanship, and his illegitimate children by the actress Dorothea Jordan. The yacht was also used to fire gun salutes at garden parties and other entertainments at Fort Belvedere, a folly overlooking the lake, which was regularly used by the royal family. She was armed with twenty-two brass 1-pounder cannon and was supervised, along with the other vessels on the lake, by a Royal Navy officer; in 1861, Captain David Welch was appointed "Keeper of Her Majesty’s Boats and other Vessels at Virginia Water" on a salary of £150 per annum.

By 1862, the Royal Adelaide was becoming dilapidated and although the issue of replacement was raised, Queen Victoria stated that she should be retained in a "purely ornamental" condition and repairs were carried out accordingly. A Royal Navy survey of 1877 advised that her timbers were unsound and consequently she was condemned to be broken-up, but survived long enough to fire a salute on Victoria's forty-first accession day on 20 June 1878.

== Surviving elements ==
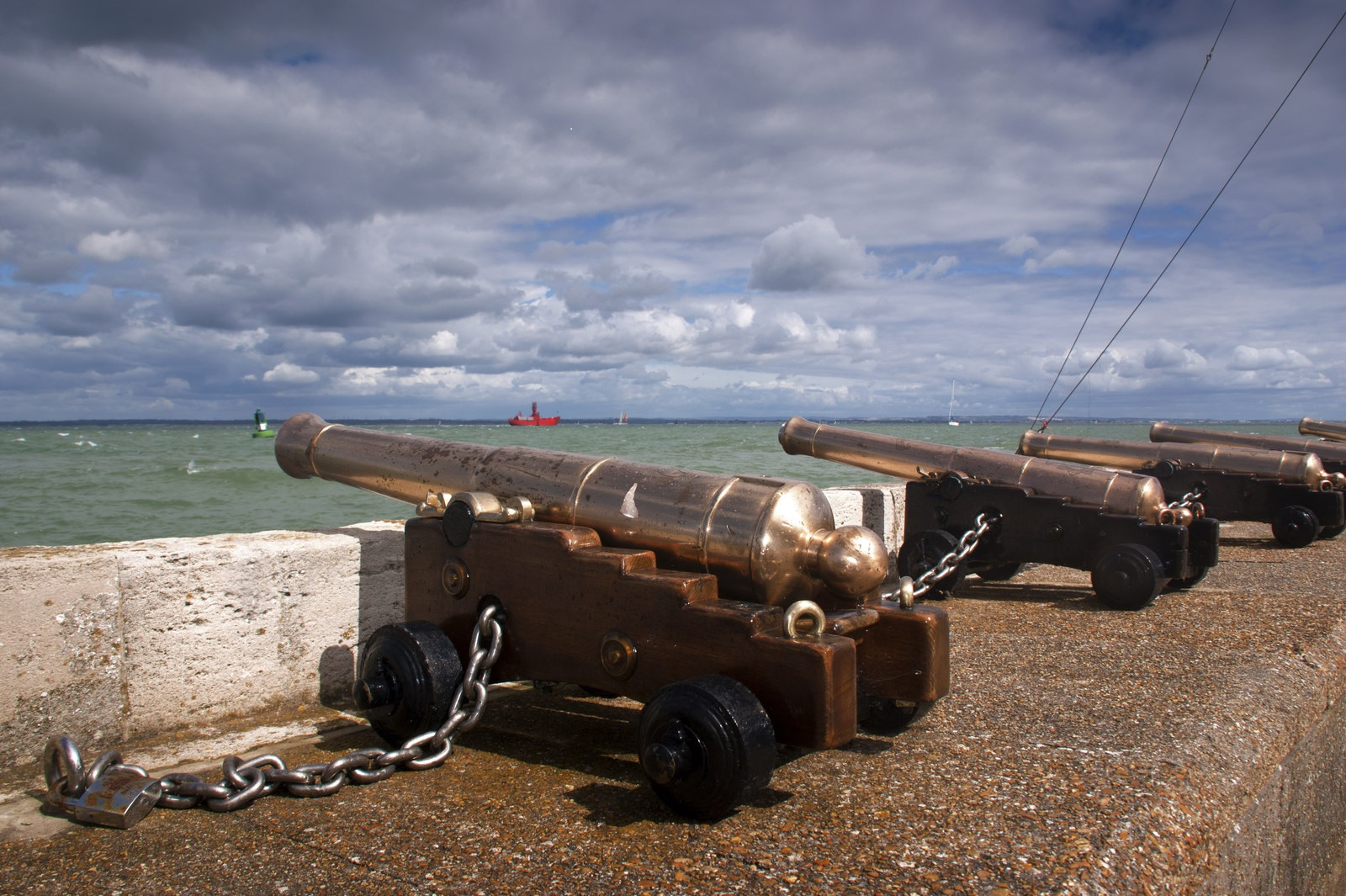
The 1-pounder brass guns from Royal Adelaide at Cowes Castle.

The figurehead of Royal Adelaide has survived and is now in the collection National Museum of the Royal Navy, Portsmouth. The brass cannons were donated by the Prince of Wales, later King Edward VII, to the Royal Yacht Squadron at Cowes Castle, where they are used today to signal the start of races, especially at Cowes Week. Four of the guns have been stolen in recent decades but have been replaced by replicas. The guns are in the care of the Yeoman of the Royal Yacht Squadron and are now fired remotely by race officials. A 1:24 scale ship model is in the collection of the National Maritime Museum in Greenwich.

== See also ==
- List of royal yachts of the United Kingdom
