= Cowes Castle =

Device fort in England

- Isle of Wight, England
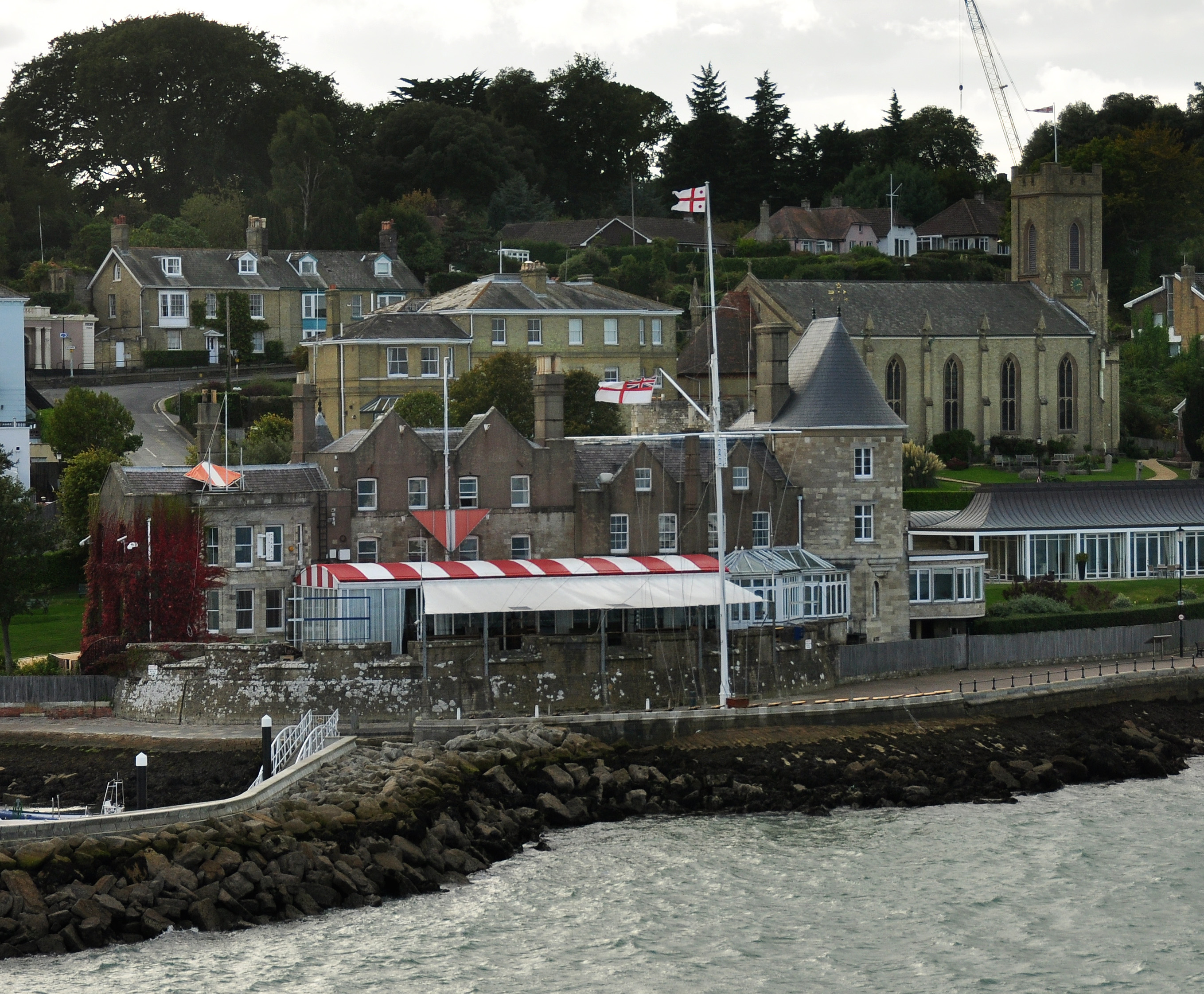

Site information
- Type: Device Fort
- Owner: Royal Yacht Squadron
- Open to the public: No

Location
- Coordinates: 50°45′59″N 1°18′04″W

Site history
- Built: 1539; 487 years ago
- Events: English Civil War, Second World War

Listed Building – Grade II*
- Official name: West Cowes castle
- Designated: 17 August 1951
- Reference no.: 1267310

Cowes Castle, also known as West Cowes Castle, is a Device Fort in Cowes on the Isle of Wight. Originally built by Henry VIII in 1539 to protect England against the threat of invasion from France and the Holy Roman Empire, it comprised a circular bastion, flanking wings and a keep, and in 1547 it housed 17 pieces of artillery. With its companion fortification at East Cowes, the castle overlooked the entrance to the River Medina, an important anchorage. The invasion threat passed but the fortification continued in use until the middle of the 19th century, very briefly seeing action in 1642 during the English Civil War.

Decommissioned in 1854, the castle was first leased, and later bought outright, by the Royal Yacht Squadron to form their new clubhouse. The Squadron then employed the architect Anthony Salvin to rebuild large parts of it between 1856 and 1858. It became the headquarters for part of the D-Day invasion force during the Second World War, but has otherwise remained in use by the Squadron and is a distinctive landmark in yacht races along the Isle of Wight.

== History ==
=== 16th century ===
Cowes Castle was built as a consequence of international tensions between England, France and the Holy Roman Empire in the final years of the reign of King Henry VIII. Traditionally the Crown had left coastal defences to the local lords and communities, only taking a modest role in building and maintaining fortifications, and while France and the Empire remained in conflict with one another, maritime raids were common but an actual invasion of England seemed unlikely. Modest defences, based around simple blockhouses and towers, existed in the south-west and along the Sussex coast, augmented by a few more impressive works in the north of England, but in general the fortifications were very limited in scale.

In 1533, Henry broke with Pope Paul III to annul the long-standing marriage to his wife, Catherine of Aragon, and remarry. Catherine was the aunt of Charles V, the Holy Roman Emperor, and he took the annulment as a personal insult. This resulted in France and the Empire declaring an alliance against Henry in 1538, and the Pope encouraging the two countries to attack England. An invasion of England appeared certain. In response, Henry issued an order, called a "device", in 1539, giving instructions for the "defence of the realm in time of invasion" and the construction of forts along the English coastline.

The Solent, a stretch of water that gave access to the ports of Southampton and Portsmouth, was considered vulnerable to attack. Two castles were built on the west and east sides of the River Medina, the entrance to the principal harbour of the adjacent Isle of Wight, and were intended to attack any enemy ships that might approach. The castles took their names from the traditional term for this location, "the Cowes". Constructed in 1539, the western fortification, which became known as West Cowes Castle, had a D-shaped bastion at the front, a round, two-storey keep at the rear and two low buildings on either side, all of which mounted artillery guns. The landward side was protected by a ditch 4 metres (13 ft) wide and a stone wall at least 2.4 metres (7 ft 10 in) wide at the top. It was built from limestone ashlar stone, which may have been recycled from the demolition of nearby Beaulieu Abbey, a consequence of Henry's recent dissolution of the monasteries.

Settlements grew up around both castles on the Medina, but East Cowes Castle was rapidly abandoned and ultimately destroyed by coastal erosion; as a result, today West Cowes Castle is often simply referred to as Cowes Castle. Inspections in 1547 showed that there were 17 iron and brass artillery pieces at the fort, but that nine of these were inoperable; nonetheless it continued in use as a fortification after the original invasion scare had ended, staffed with a garrison of a captain, porter and three gunners during Queen Elizabeth's reign.

=== 17th–19th centuries ===
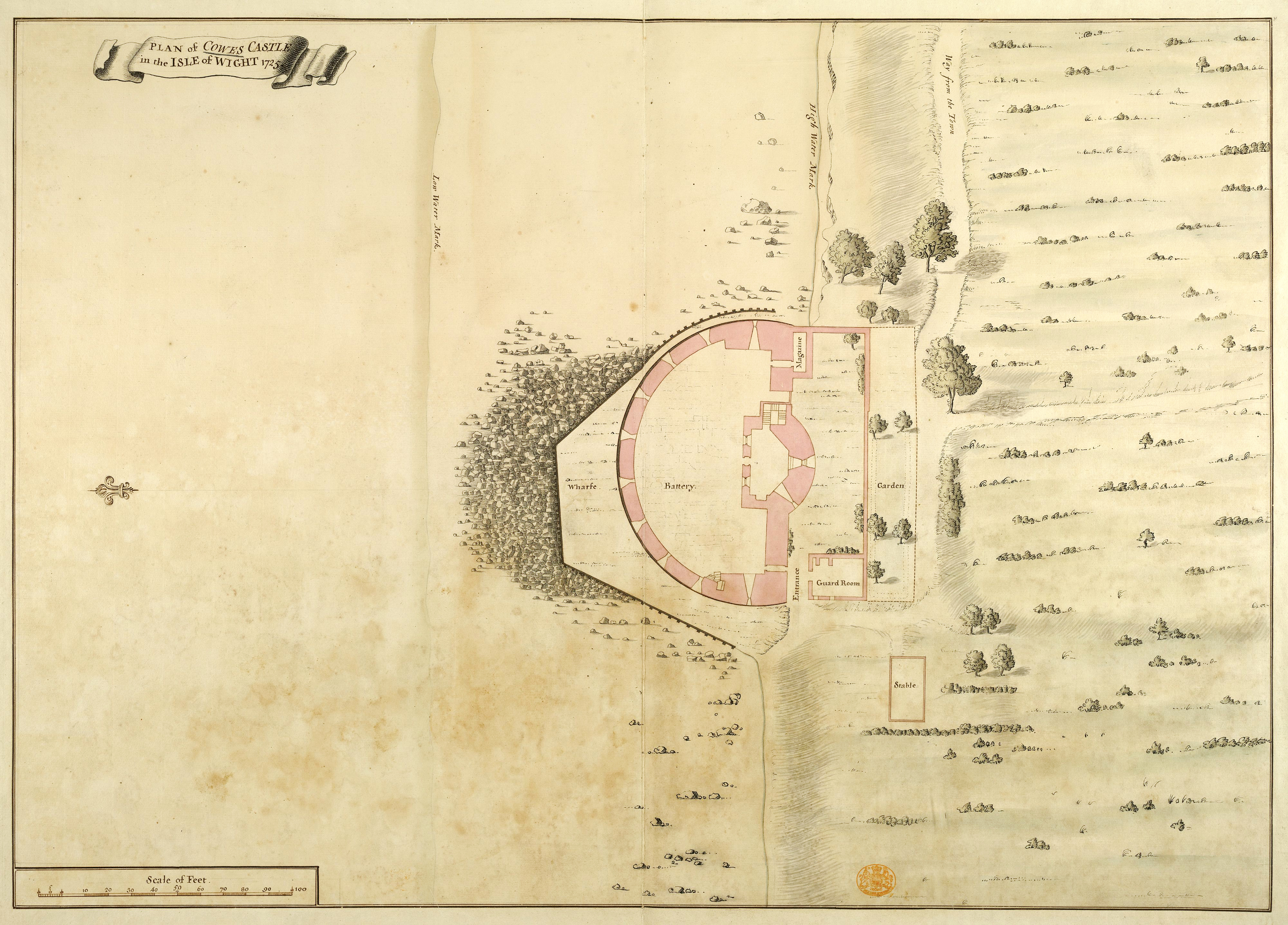
1725 plan of the castle

Cowes Castle was used to house important visitors to the Isle of Wight and also as a prison; the captain of the castle had further responsibilities for managing the arrival of foreign vessels. When the English Civil War broke out in 1642 between the supporters of Charles I and Parliament, the castle was initially held for the King by its captain, Humphrey Turney. On 12 August, as tensions between the rival factions on the island increased, Turney personally fired one of the castle's guns at the nearby Parliamentary naval vessel Lion. An unidentified Scottish naval captain then came ashore on 16 August and captured Turney, before landing more men and taking the castle for Parliament, who held it for the rest of the war.

During the Interregnum, the castle continued to be used as a prison. Charles I could not be housed in the castle while en route to his imprisonment by Parliament at Carisbrooke Castle in 1647 because the facility was full, and he stayed at a local alehouse instead. The Royalist Sir William Davenant was imprisoned in Cowes during 1650, writing the poem Gondibert while incarcerated. As with East Cowes Castle, coastal erosion proved a particular problem for the fortification. An inspection in 1692 reported that the walls were cracked and at risk of collapse, and the antiquarian Francis Grose observed in 1785 that the castle was "strongly fenced with piles and planks" to prevent erosion from the sea.

During the course of the 18th century, Cowes became a fashionable location for visitors, with several bathhouses, one of them located beside the castle, and by the early 19th century the town had become a noted resort. Cowes Castle was partially rebuilt in 1716 to modernise its accommodation. Most of the front of the keep was demolished and rebuilt with new windows, a turret for a spiral staircase was erected, new three- and two-storey residential wings were added, and a garden was created over the landward defences. In 1795, the writer Richard Warner noted that the garrison consisted of the captain, a porter, two soldiers, a master gunner and five regular gunners, their wages coming to £103 a year. (Note: Comparing 18th-century costs and prices with those of the modern period depends on the price comparison used. £103 in 1795 could be worth between £9,700 and £690,000 in 2014 terms, depending on the measure used.) The castle remained in use during the Napoleonic Wars, and in 1825 was equipped with eleven 9-pound (4.1 kg) guns. Warner had already complained, though, that the castle was "utterly useless" in military terms and a guidebook in 1824 echoed this judgement, describing Cowes as "useless as a place of defence" and ridiculing the sentries on duty there.

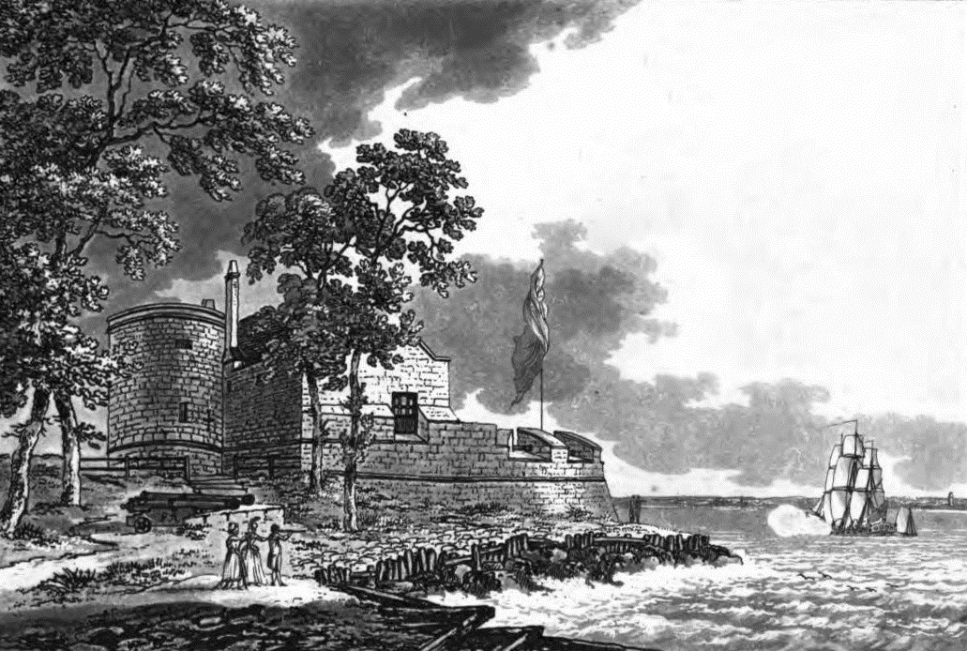
An engraving of the castle in 1796

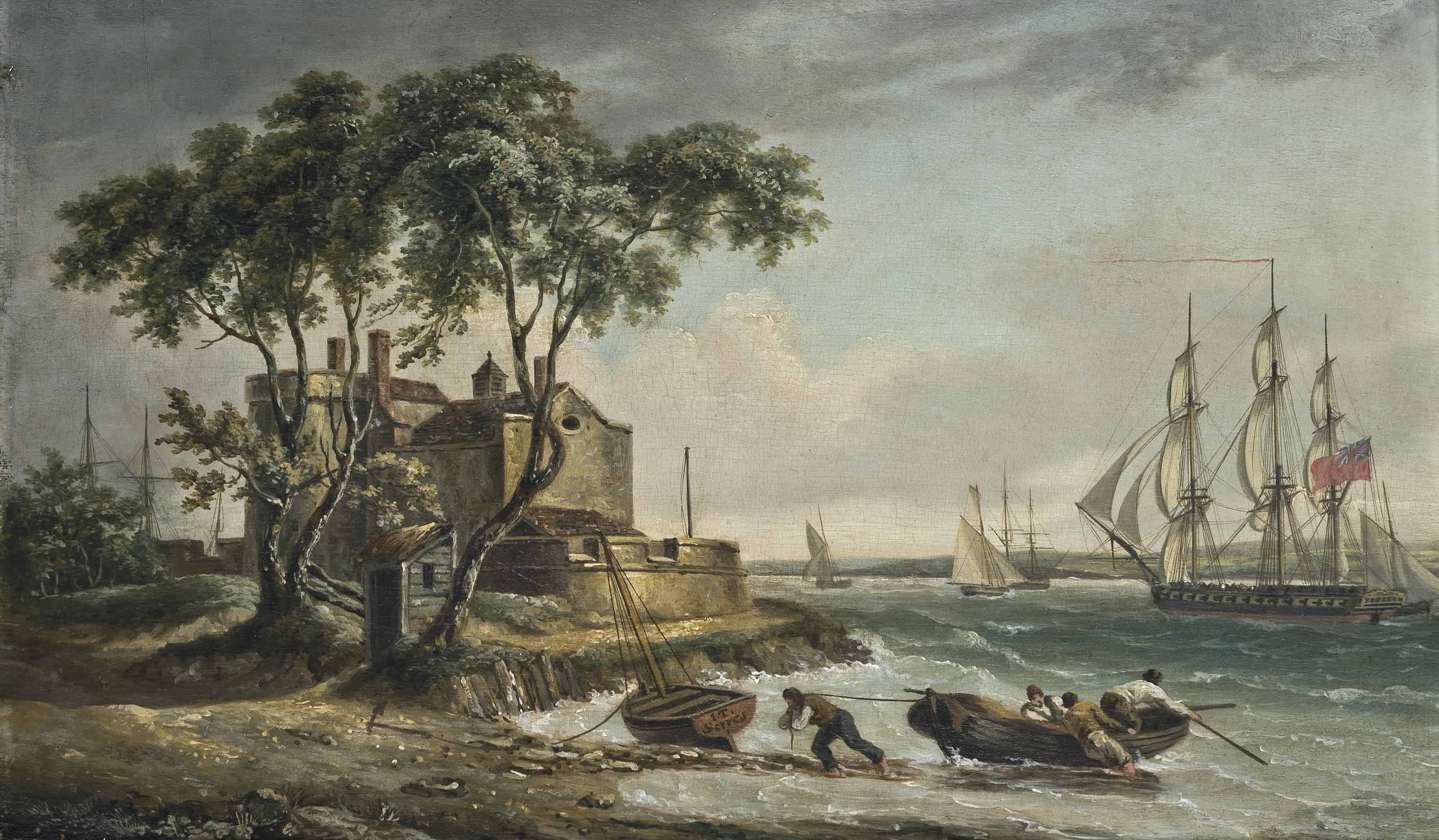
The castle by John Thomas Serres

Lord Anglesey became the captain of Cowes Castle in 1826, by now a sinecure rather than a regular military appointment, and spent part of each year at the castle, making further, lavish improvements to the interiors. Anglesey was also a member of the Royal Yacht Squadron, first established in 1815, which then operated from the Gloster Hotel in Cowes. By this time yachting had become a prestigious local event; the painter J. M. W. Turner sketched the yachts sailing off the castle when he visited in 1827. When Anglesey died in 1854 the government decommissioned the castle and leased the property initially to Anglesey's son-in-law Lord Conyngham, and then to the Squadron in 1855.

The architect Anthony Salvin, an expert on adapting medieval buildings, was employed by the Squadron to remodel the building between 1856 and 1858. He enlarged the house, altered its profile and built a new tower, platform and a gatehouse, along with a service wing, a ballroom and more accommodation for the members, at a cost of around £6,000. Prince Albert and Edward, the Prince of Wales, visited the castle before it was formally reopened in 1858; the work received mixed reviews, one local newspaper likening the result to "a discipline establishment". Cowes became a major centre for yachting. After the destruction of William IV's miniature frigate the Royal Adelaide in 1877, its 21 brass cannons were donated to the castle by the Prince of Wales.

=== 20th–21st centuries ===
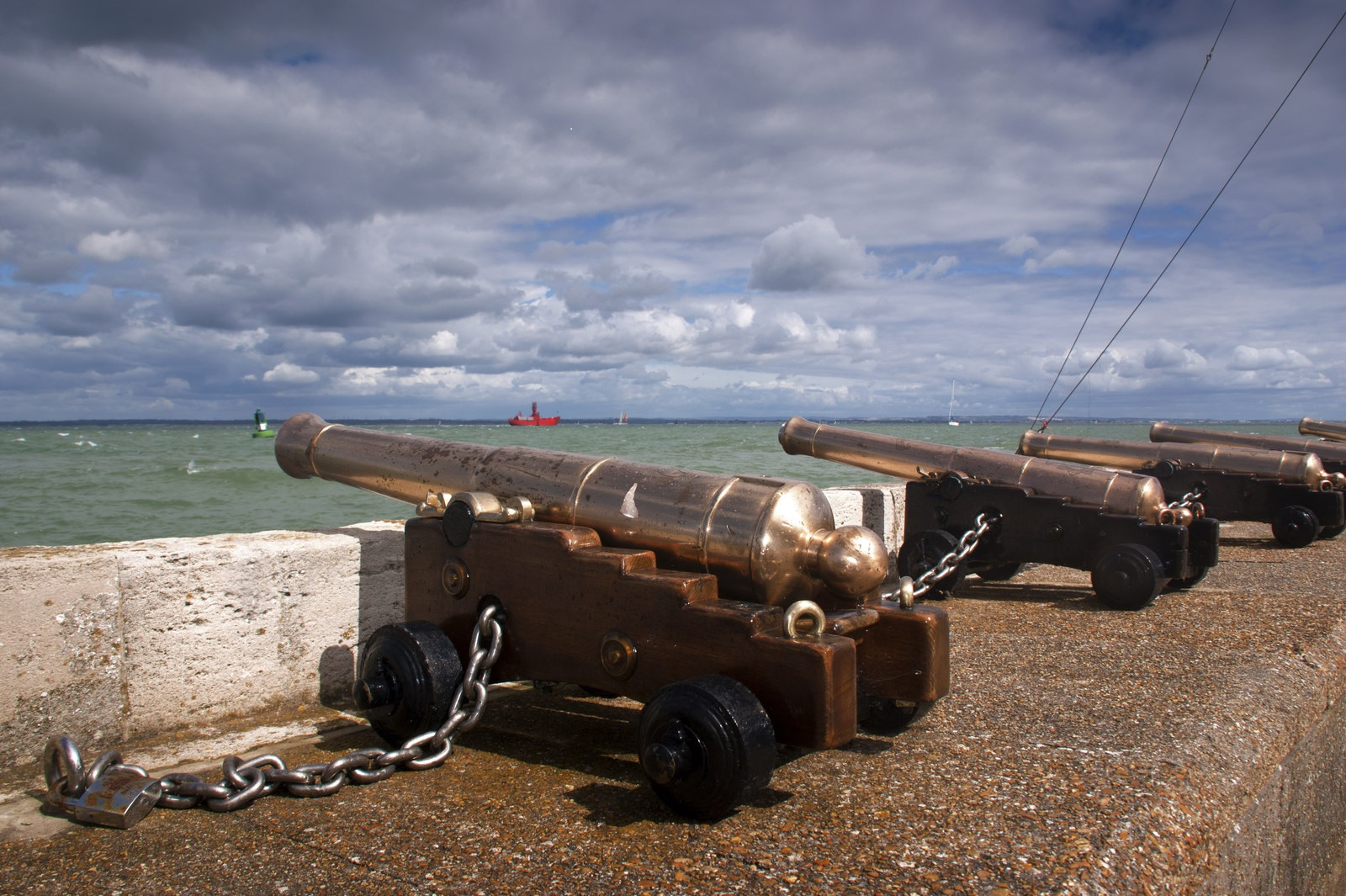
William IV's brass cannon at the castle in 2012

Cowes Castle was bought outright from the Crown by the Royal Yacht Squadron in 1917. Further development work was carried out on the property in the 1920s, and a ballroom in an adjacent hotel was purchased for use as an annexe for female members.

The Isle of Wight became an important staging location for the Allied efforts to invade France during the Second World War. By October 1942, the castle was occupied by the British Admiralty and became the senior officer's headquarters of the HQ Naval Commander Force "J" Landing Craft base, known as HMS Vectis. The force's vessels docked in the nearby Solent, and took part in the D-Day landings. The castle was damaged during the German bombing raids on the island.

After the war, the architect A. G. Biggs carried out substantial additions to the castle between 1962 and 1968, including remodelling the western range to provide for more female accommodation, using stone from the second East Cowes Castle, an 18th and 19th-century stately home, which had been demolished the previous year. A prefabricated conservatory extension followed in 1988, and a new pavilion designed by Sir Thomas Croft was added in 2000.

Archaeological excavations in the winter of 2010–11 rediscovered the remains of the old castle wall and ditch, and more than 400 artefacts were removed for storage at the Isle of Wight County Museum. Cowes Castle is a distinctive landmark in yachting and powerboat events, particularly at the start and finish of local races. It is protected under UK law as a Grade II* Listed Building.

== Bibliography ==
- Anonymous (1824). A Guide to all the Watering and Sea Bathing Places. London, UK: Longman, Hurst, Rees, Orme and Brown. OCLC 316568111.
- Clark, Arthur H. (1904). The History of Yachting, 1600–1815. New York City and London, UK: G.P. Putnam's Sons. OCLC 316568111.
- Finley, Eric Gault (1994). RCN Beach Commando "W". Ottawa, Canada: Gilmore. OCLC 37489940.
- Godwin, George Nelson (1904). The Civil War in Hampshire (1642–45) and the Story of Basing House (new and revised ed.). Southampton, UK: Henry March Gilbert and Son. OCLC 4237451.
- Grose, Francis (1785). Antiquities of England and Wales. Vol. 2 (new ed.). London, UK: Hooper. OCLC 265001630.
- Hale, John R. (1983). Renaissance War Studies. London, UK: Hambledon Press. ISBN 0907628176.
- Harrington, Peter (2007). The Castles of Henry VIII. Oxford, UK: Osprey Publishing. ISBN 9781472803801.
- Hopkins, Dave (2004). Extensive Urban Survey – Hampshire and the Isle of Wight. London, UK: English Heritage. doi:10.5284/1000227.
- King, D. J. Cathcart (1991). The Castle in England and Wales: An Interpretative History. London, UK: Routledge Press. ISBN 9780415003506.
- Marquess of Anglesey (1996) [1961]. One Leg: The Life and Letters of Henry William Paget, First Marquess of Anglesey, K.G. 1768–1854. London, UK: Leo Cooper. ISBN 9781783837571.
- Morley, B. M. (1976). Henry VIII and the Development of Coastal Defence. London, UK: Her Majesty's Stationery Office. ISBN 0116707771.
- Saunders, Andrew (1989). Fortress Britain: Artillery Fortifications in the British Isles and Ireland. Liphook, UK: Beaufort. ISBN 1855120003.
- Thompson, M. W. (1987). The Decline of the Castle. Cambridge, UK: Cambridge University Press. ISBN 1854226088.
- Walton, Steven A. (2010). "State Building Through Building for the State: Foreign and Domestic Expertise in Tudor Fortification". Osiris. 25 (1): 66–84. doi:10.1086/657263. S2CID 144384757.
- Warner, Richard (1795). The History of the Isle of Wight. Southampton, UK: T. Cadell, W. Davies and T. Baker. OCLC 606282339.
- Woolnoth, William (1825). The Ancient Castles of England and Wales. Vol. 1. London, UK: Longman, Hurst and Company. OCLC 13310887.
