= River Solent =

Prehistoric river in southern England

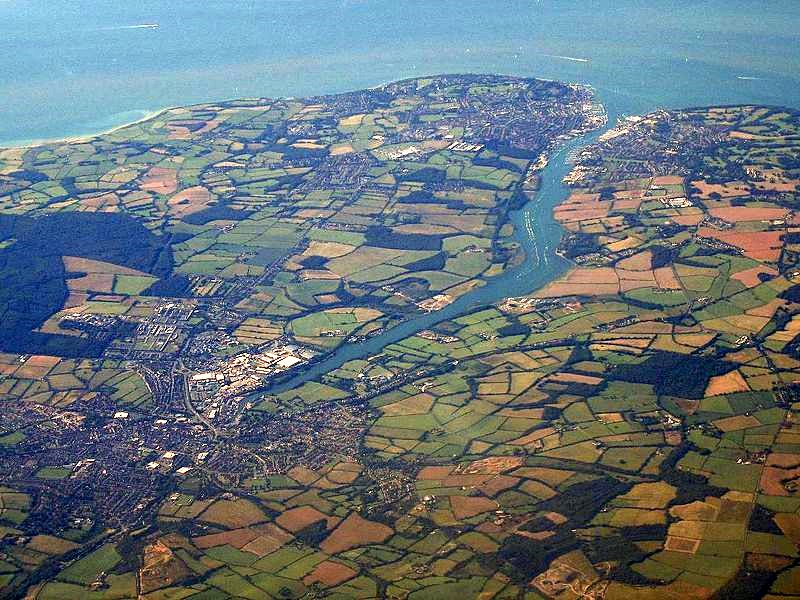
The River Medina's estuary and harbour at East Cowes and Cowes (upper right) is a ria, or a flooded river valley which was previously a feature of the River Solent.

The River Solent is a now-extinct river which during the Pleistocene would have flowed around the area which is now the coastlines of Hampshire and the Isle of Wight in England.

== History ==
The River Solent was one of three major rivers in central and southern England, together with the Proto-Thames and Bytham, but unlike the other two it was not destroyed by the extreme Anglian Glaciation around 450,000 years ago. It became extinct after flooding following the end of the last ice age, becoming submerged and incorporated into the Solent, a strait of the English Channel that sits between the Isle of Wight and Hampshire. The River Solent's source was the River Frome, and the River Solent's tributaries, the River Test, River Itchen, the Hampshire River Avon and the River Medina, still survive today. Several towns on both the South Coast and the Isle of Wight are built near features of the River Solent; Cowes and East Cowes are built around the mouth of the River Medina, which formed due to the flooding of one of the shallow valleys formed by the River Solent.

== Geology ==
The areas around the River Solent are, like most of Hampshire, made up of chalk and Tertiary (mostly Eocene) clays and sands with minor limestones.
