= Dead Calm: Boats off Cowes Castle =

Painting by Augustus Wall Callcott

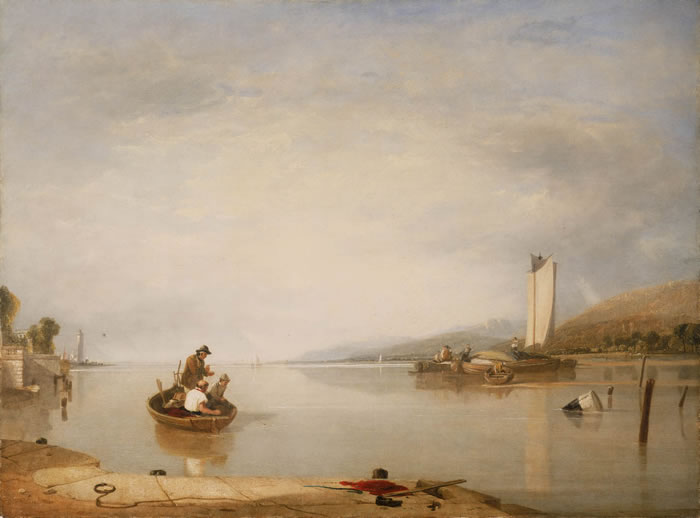
- Artist: Augustus Wall Callcott
- Year: c. 1827
- Type: Oil on canvas, landscape
- Dimensions: 89 cm × 119 cm (35 in × 47 in)
- Location: National Maritime Museum, Greenwich

Dead Calm: Boats off Cowes Castle is an oil on canvas seascape by the British artist Augustus Wall Callcott, from c. 1827.

== History and description ==
It portrays a view of the River Medina at Cowes on the Isle of Wight. Callcott portrays fishing boats in the river, with John Nash's East Cowes Castle away to the left. Several vessels lie becalmed on the waters including a hay barge.

It is not intended to be topographically accurate and is inspired by riverscapes of the Italian style. Calcott produced several versions of the painting, one of which was submitted to the Royal Academy's Exhibition of 1827. As J. M. W. Turner stayed with Nash that year and produced his own depiction of the river, it may have heightened the rivalry between the two artists. The work is in the collection National Maritime Museum in Greenwich.

== Bibliography ==
- Hokanson, Alison. Turner's Whaling Pictures. Metropolitan Museum of Art, 2016.
- Wright, Christopher, Gordon, Catherine May & Smith, Mary Peskett. British and Irish Paintings in Public Collections: An Index of British and Irish Oil Paintings by Artists Born Before 1870 in Public and Institutional Collections in the United Kingdom and Ireland. Yale University Press, 2006.
