= East Cowes Castle (painting) =

Painting by J. M. W. Turner

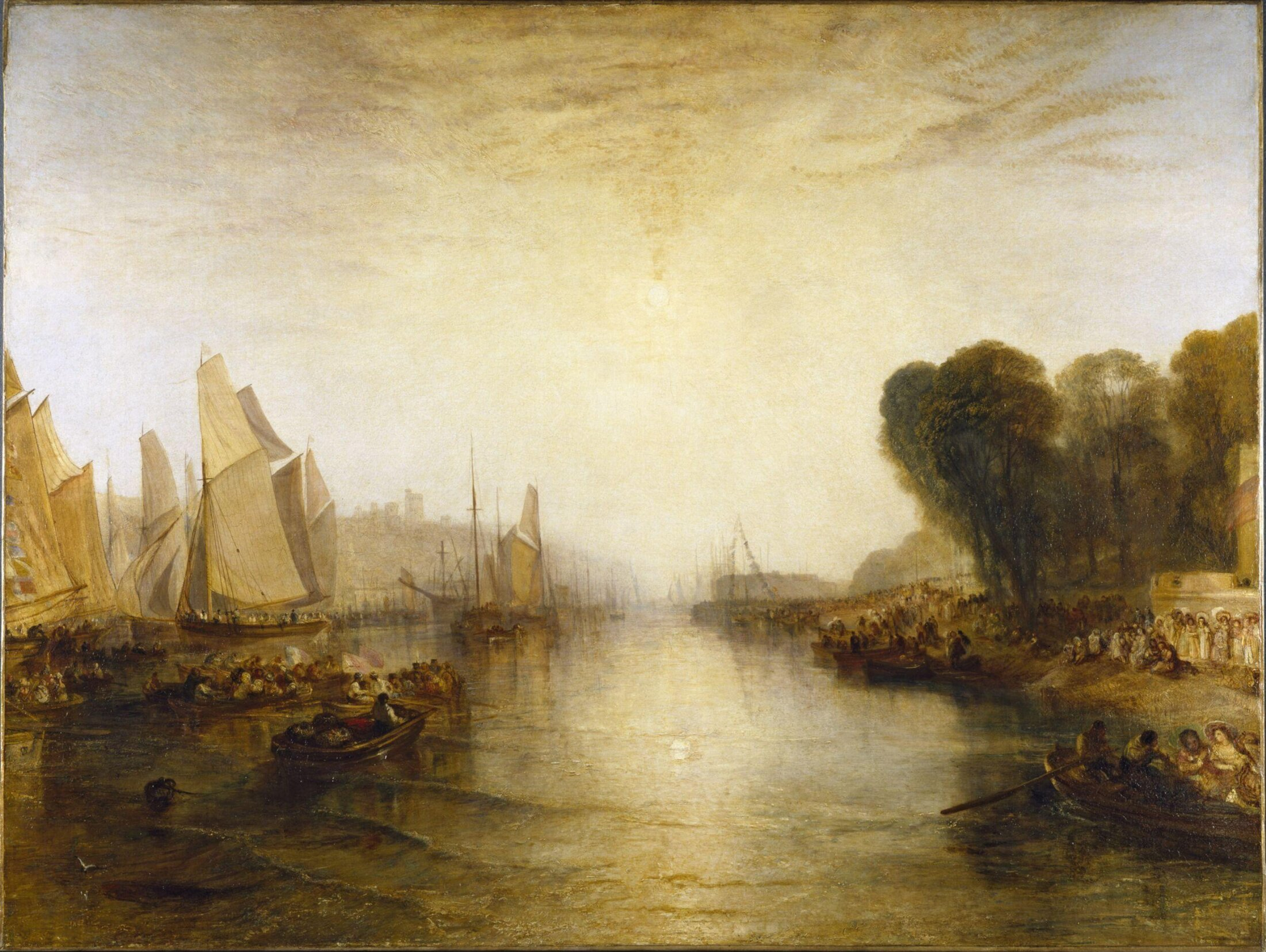
- Artist: J. M. W. Turner
- Year: 1827–28
- Type: Oil on canvas, landscape
- Dimensions: 91.4 cm × 123.2 cm (36.0 in × 48.5 in)
- Location: Victoria and Albert Museum, London

East Cowes Castle is an 1828 landscape painting by the British artist J. M. W. Turner. It depicts the Cowes Regatta and is sometimes known as The Regatta Starting for their Moorings to distinguish it from a companion piece The Regatta Beating to Windward.

In the summer of 1827 Turner was invited to stay at East Cowes Castle on the Isle of Wight by the Regency era architect John Nash, who has designed the building himself. It was the artist's first visit to the island, which has inspired one of his breakthrough works Fishermen at Sea, in more than three decades. While there he witnessed the Regatta, founded the previous year by the Royal Yacht Club, producing many sketches of the various vessels.

Nash commissioned two works from Turner inspired by the Regatta, both of which were displayed at the Royal Academy's Summer Exhibition at Somerset House in 1828. It was widely praised by critics, and John Ruskin later wrote it was "to my mind, one of the highest pieces of intellectual art existing". Today it is in the Victoria and Albert Museum having been donated by the art collector John Sheepshanks as part of the Sheepshanks Gift in 1857.

== See also ==
- List of paintings by J. M. W. Turner
- Dead Calm, an 1827 view of the River Medina by Turner's colleague Augustus Wall Callcott

== Bibliography ==
- Bailey, Anthony. J.M.W. Turner: Standing in the Sun. Tate Enterprises Ltd, 2013.
- Hamilton, James. Turner - A Life. Sceptre, 1998.
