= Cowes Week =

Sailing regatta

- Frequency: Annually
- Locations: Cowes, Isle of Wight, England
- Website: www.cowesweek.co.uk

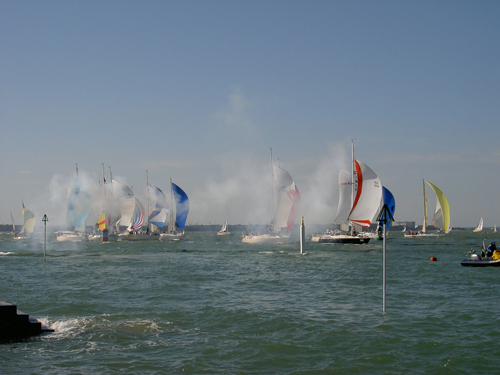
A Cowes Week race in 2003

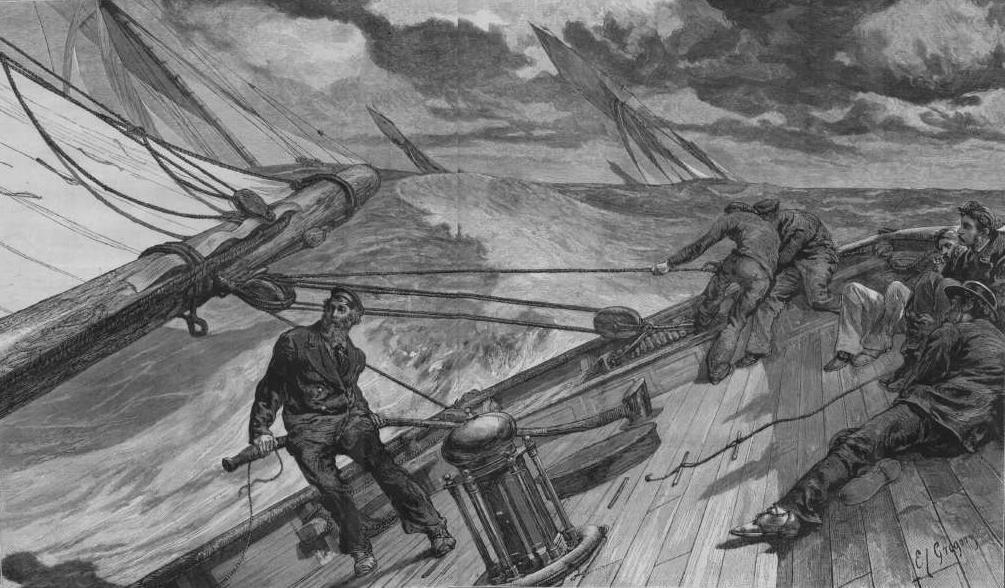
Regatta off Cowes in 1875

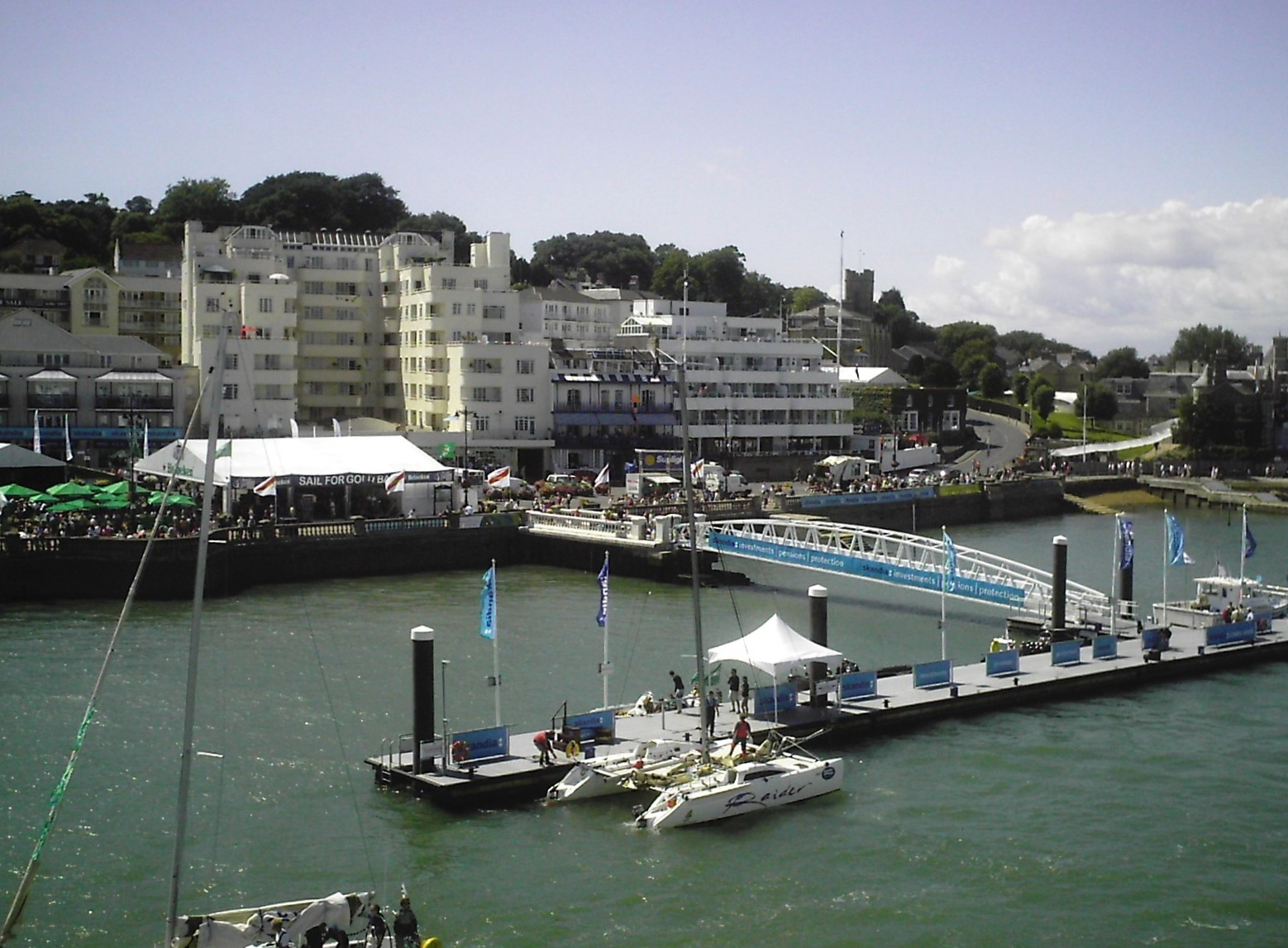
Cowes Parade in Cowes Week 2007

Cowes Week (/kaʊz/ KOWZ) is one of the longest-running regular regattas in the world. With 40 daily sailing races, around 500 boats, and 2500 competitors ranging from Olympic and world-class professionals to weekend sailors, it is the largest sailing regatta of its kind in the world. Having started in 1826, the event is held in August each year on the Solent (the area of water between southern England and the Isle of Wight made tricky by strong double tides), and is run by Cowes Week Limited in the small town of Cowes on the Isle of Wight.

== Description ==
Cowes Week is held at the beginning of August, set after Glorious Goodwood in the social calendar, which in most years means from the first Saturday after the last Tuesday in July, until the following Friday. It is occasionally moved to another week if the state of the tides in the normal week is unfavourable or, as in 2012, to avoid a clash with the Olympic Games. The regatta was famous for its fireworks on the final Friday, however there has not been a display since 2019. The display had taken place on the final Friday of the event since the early days and was an iconic finale.

A typical Cowes Week has up to forty starts a day for classes of cruiser-racers, one designs and keelboats; around 500 boats and 2,500 competitors take part. During this time the Solent, which is a busy commercial waterway, is filled with boats of all classes and is particularly colourful due to the spinnakers (the large rounded sail hoisted at the front of a yacht when running downwind). The different classes of boats are split into either White Group (dayboats) and Black Group (larger boats with cabins).

As well as the sailing activities, the week includes many onshore events including live music and cocktail parties. Marquees are erected in the marinas serving food and drink, and the crowds overflow from busy public houses and restaurants around the narrow high street – the town becomes a hive of activity into the early hours of each morning. Around 100,000 visitors are attracted to Cowes by the festival atmosphere of the event each year in addition to all the competitors.

From 1995 to 2008, its official title was Skandia Cowes Week, named after title sponsor Skandia the Swedish financial services group. From 2011 to 2016 its official title was Aberdeen Asset Management Cowes Week, named after the title sponsor. For 2017 and 2018 the event was known as Lendy Cowes Week, after Lendy Limited took over title sponsorship. In 2019, Lendy ceased to be title sponsors. Other supporters include Communications Sponsor aql.

== History ==
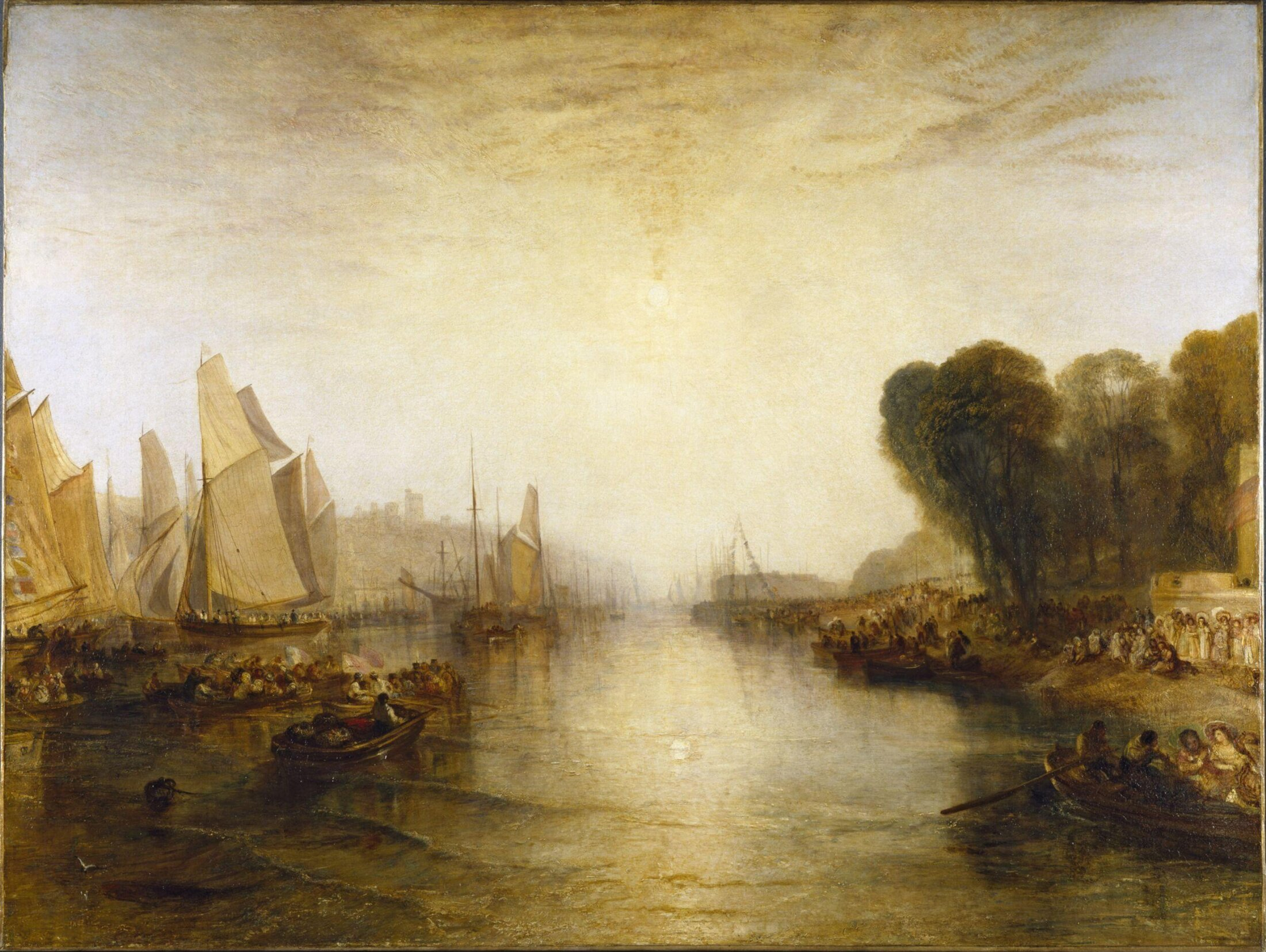
The Cowes Regatta as shown in East Cowes Castle by J. M. W. Turner 1827

The festival originates from the Prince Regent's interest in yachting which continued after he became George IV in 1820. The first race started at 09:30 on Thursday 10 August 1826 with the prize of a "Gold Cup of the value of £100" and was held under the flag of the Royal Yacht Club, which later became the Royal Yacht Squadron. Another race was held the next day for prize money only (£30 for first place, £20 for second).

Until World War I, big cutters and raters were raced by gentlemen amateurs employing skippers and crew. In the 1920s and 1930s, there were cruiser handicap classes and local one-designs (although the six to eight and twelve metre classes attracted the most racing interest). Following World War II, when there was a revival of big yacht racing, ocean racing classes started to predominate, especially after the first Admiral's Cup event was held in 1957 and the growth in popularity of the two ocean-going races that start and finish the regatta The Channel and the Fastnet. The Fastnet, which rounds the Fastnet rock far out in the Atlantic and can be dangerous, is held in odd-numbered years only.

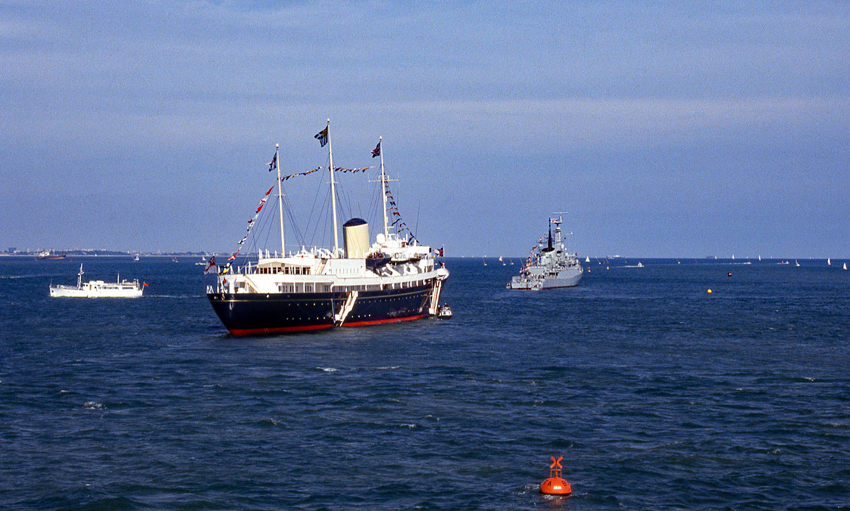
HMY Britannia anchored off Cowes during Cowes Week 1991

In the decades following the Second World War, yachting increasingly became more accessible beyond its traditional association with wealthy participants, with many sailors participating in privately operated yachts of 30 to 40 feet in length. Cowes Week also contributed to the growth of water-based activities and sailing schools, helping to promote sailing among a broader range of age groups and backgrounds. Although some events, during the regatta remain associated with exclusive clubs and private functions, Cowes Week includes a variety of public events and attractions aimed at a diverse audience.

Key shoreside events of Cowes Week include the festivities within Cowes Yacht Haven, on Cowes Parade and at Shepards Wharf Marina. Each of these venues offer entertainment for the public as well as those racing.

Traditionally at the end of the Cowes Week event, a fireworks display is held. This has occurred for more than 150 years. In recent years contributions to the funding of the display have been requested by the community who enjoy and benefit from them.

In 2012, Gillian Smith became the first female Principal Race Officer to oversee the racing.

== Major trophies ==
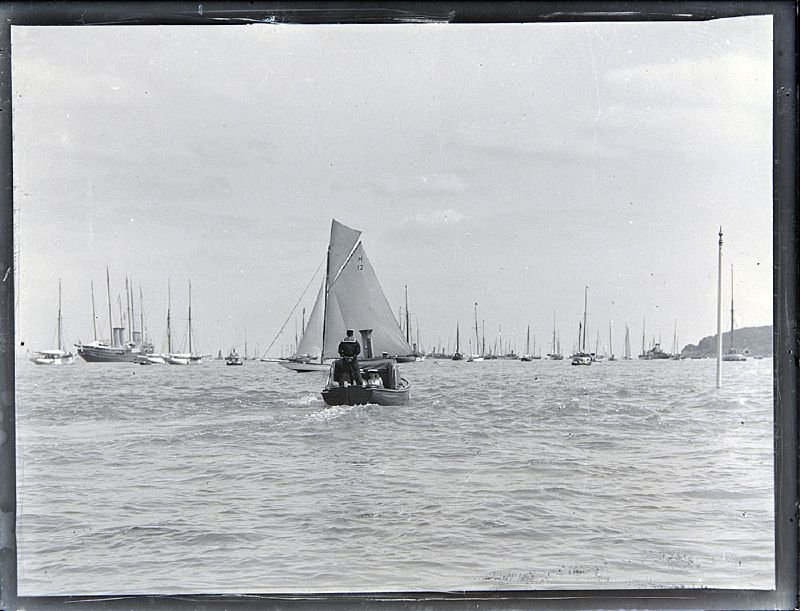
Cowes Moorings in Race Week, c1900

The Queen's Cup was presented to the Royal Southampton Yacht Club by Queen Victoria in 1897, her Diamond Jubilee year. Eleven boats entered the first Queen's Cup race on 9 August 1897. It was won by Latana, a 165-ton yawl owned by Mr W M Johnstone, by far the biggest boat in the race. The Cup was subsequently raced for on the opening day of Cowes Week but, shortly after the turn of the 20th century, it was lost. Re-discovered in 1937 in a second-hand shop in Cardiff by a club member, Captain "Jonah" Jones, the Cup was bought back for the princely sum of £35/0/0. The Queen's Cup has traditionally been awarded by the RSY to the IRC Class 0 winner racing on the first Saturday of the event.

In 1950, Sir Peter Scott suggested to King George VI that larger yachts should compete for a new trophy as it was felt that the America's Cup could not be restarted after the war. It was time for another competition of international significance to be introduced. King George was in favour and presented a trophy to the Royal Yachting Association, naming it The Britannia Cup. It certainly acted as a stimulus to big boat racing after the war. This competition also gave points towards the Admiral's Cup. The Britannia Cup was first won in 1951 by Taisser IV and Group Captain R J S Barton. The Britannia Cup is awarded to the winner of the class nominated by the Royal Yacht Squadron on the Tuesday of the event, this is usually IRC Class 0 or IRC Class 1.

The New York Yacht Club Challenge Cup was presented by the New York Yacht Club in 1951 on 100th Anniversary of America's victory which led to the commencement of the America's Cup. It was presented to the Royal Yacht Squadron for races during Cowes Week Class 1. In 1957, with the advent of the Admiral's Cup, points won in this race counted towards the Admiral's Cup. In some ways the Admiral's Cup was an extension of the N.Y.Y.C. Cup in that Miles Wyatt and four friends presented this overall trophy to encourage overseas yachts to race at Cowes. Latifa, owned by Michael Mason, first won the Cup in 1951. The New York Yacht Club Challenge Cup is awarded to the winner of the class nominated by the Royal Yacht Squadron on the Wednesday of the event, this is usually IRC Class 0 or IRC Class 1.

The Young Skipper's Trophy is awarded to the Skipper, aged under 25 on the Sunday immediately after the event, who achieves the best results over the course of the entire Week. The competition is open to young skippers across all classes. The Trophy was first presented by Skandia at the 1995 event and recognises the success of the yachtsmen and women of the future.

The Overall Winner Trophy is awarded to the winner of either Black Group or White Group, determined by the overall winner on points and is awarded with a special Scottish quaich.

== In art ==
French painter Raoul Dufy has depicted the races and Royal Yacht Squadron in several works of the late 1920s and early '30s, the most famous one of which is now in the National Gallery of Art in Washington D.C.

J.M.W. Turner also made a series of paintings, watercolours and pencil sketches of the regatta while visiting Cowes Castle in 1827.

== See also ==
- Barcolana regatta
- Kiel Week
- Royal Hobart Regatta
