= Royal Yacht Squadron =

British sailing club

- Burgee

- Ensign
- Short name: RYS
- Founded: 1 June 1815; 211 years ago
- Location: Cowes Castle, Isle of Wight, England
- Commodore: Robert M. Bicket
- Website: www.rys.org.uk

The Royal Yacht Squadron (RYS) is a British yacht club. Its clubhouse is Cowes Castle on the Isle of Wight in the United Kingdom. Member yachts are given the suffix RYS to their names, and are permitted (with the appropriate warrant) to wear the White Ensign of the Royal Navy rather than the merchant Red Ensign worn by the majority of other UK registered vessels. The club's patron was Queen Elizabeth II.

The Royal Yacht Squadron entered the 2021 America's Cup in Auckland, New Zealand, with the Ineos Team UK syndicate led by Sir Ben Ainslie, but did not win. In March 2021, an entity associated with the RYS, called Royal Yacht Squadron Racing Ltd, was officially accepted as the Challenger of Record for the 37th America's Cup competition.

== History ==
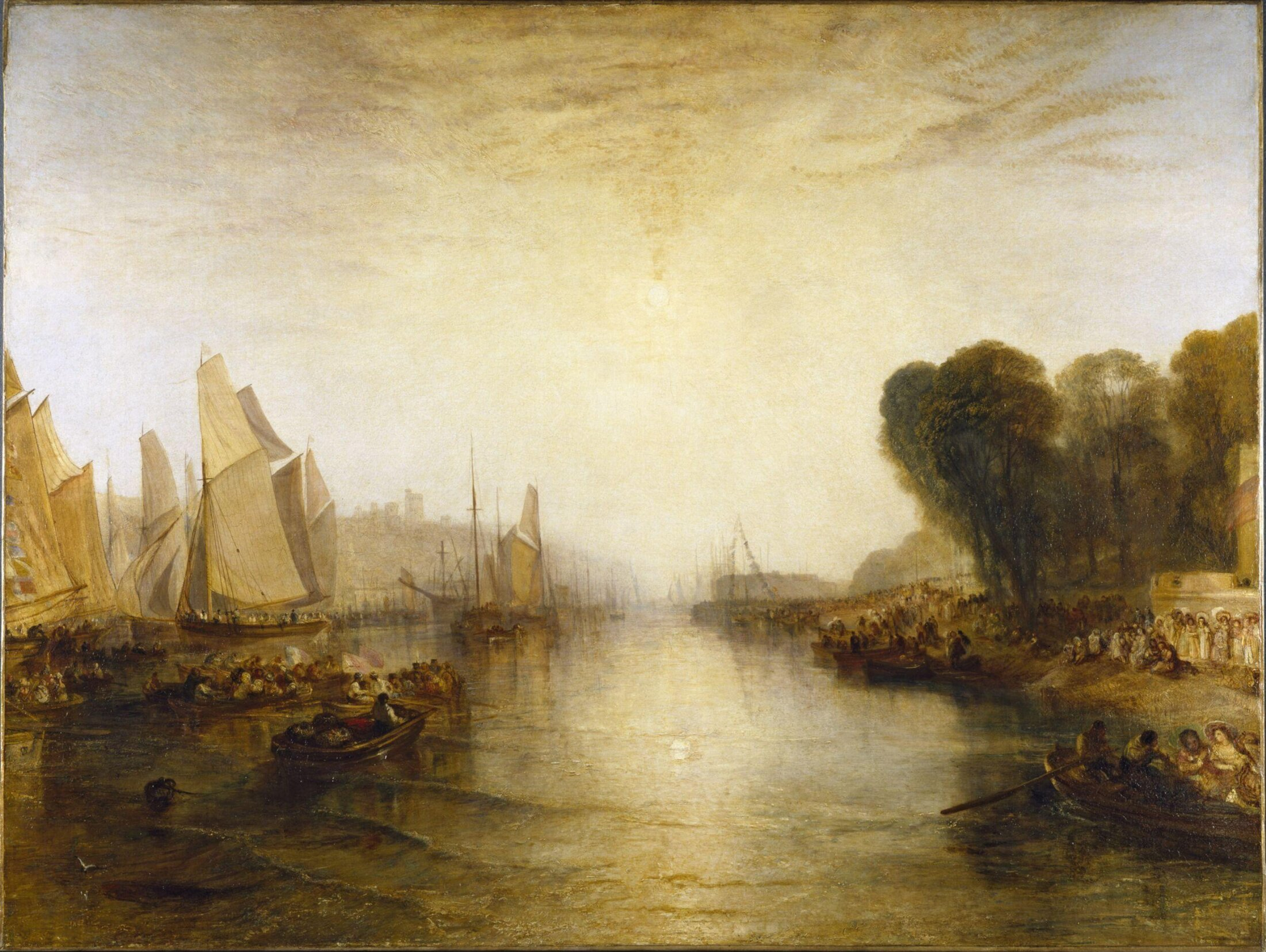
The 1827 regatta in J.M.W. Turner's East Cowes Castle

Founded on 1 June 1815 in the Thatched House Tavern in St James's, London as The Yacht Club by 42 gentlemen interested in sea yachting, the original members (Note: Original Members: Ashbrook, Viscount / Kirkwall, Viscount; Aylmer, Charles, Esqr. / Lewin, Thomas, Esqr.; Baring, William, Esqr. / Lindergreen, John, Esqr.; Belmore, The Earl of / LLoyd (of Marle), Esqr.; Berkeley, Capt. Frederick / North, The Revd Chas. A.; Blachford, P.B. Esqr. / Nugent, The Rt. Hon. Lord.; Buckingham, The Marquis of. / Pullam, The Hon. Chas. A.; Cawdor, The Rt. Hon. Lord. / Ponsonby, The Rt.Hon. Lord; Challen, S, Esqr / Puleston, Sir Richard, Bart.; Craven, The Earl of / Scott, Harry Esqr.; Curtis. Sir William, Bart. / Shedden, Colonel; Denhurst, Viscount. / Smith, Thos A, Junr. Eque.; Fazackerley, F.N. Esqr. / Thomas, Sir George, Bart.; Fitzharris, Viscount. / Thomond, The Marquis of.; Fitz Gerald, John, Esqr. / Uxbridge, The Earl of.; Grantham, The Rt Hon. Lord / Wardle, Baylis, Esqre.; Grant, Charles, Esqr. / Webster, Sir Godfrey, Bart.; Hallifax, Thomas, Esqr. / Weld, Joseph, Esqr; Hare, The Hon. William. / Weld, James, Esqr; Herbert, Henry Ar. Esqr. / Whatley, Colonel.; Hippesley, Sir J.C. Bart. / Williams, Owen, Esqr.) decided to meet in London and in Cowes twice a year, to discuss yachting over dinner. Membership was restricted to those who owned a vessel not under 10 tons. (Note: Today this is interpreted as an individual "actively interested in yachting".)

The Earl of Yarborough, later first commodore of the club, welcomed the Prince Regent as a member in 1817. In 1820, when the Prince Regent became George IV, it was renamed the Royal Yacht Club.

The club started organising racing as a principal feature of the annual regatta, which is now known as Cowes Week. In 1833, William IV renamed the club The Royal Yacht Squadron. Its association with the Royal Navy began early and Nelson's captain at Trafalgar, Admiral Sir Thomas Hardy, headed the list of naval members. The spirit of invention led to yachts "of such celerity in sailing and beauty of construction" that they were of utility to the Royal Navy. In 1829, the Admiralty issued a warrant to wear what is now the navy's White Ensign. The burgee (a triangular shaped flag identifying yacht club membership) is differenced with a St George's Cross and crown on a white background.

In 1851, one of the "forred" hands, on board the yacht America concerning the first sailing of the America's Cup, 1851 wrote 'The Royal Yacht Club—In a fix' (tune). "Come listen to my ditty, and a song to you I'll sing..."

Another naval connection is that the Antarctic explorer Robert Falcon Scott was a member of the Royal Yacht Squadron. To enable the application of naval discipline on board a civilian ship, he registered the Terra Nova RYS as a yacht of the squadron and sailed under the White Ensign on his second and final expedition to Antarctica in 1910.

In August 2013, the members of Royal Yacht Squadron voted to allow full membership to women, which had been restricted since its foundation.

== Racing ==
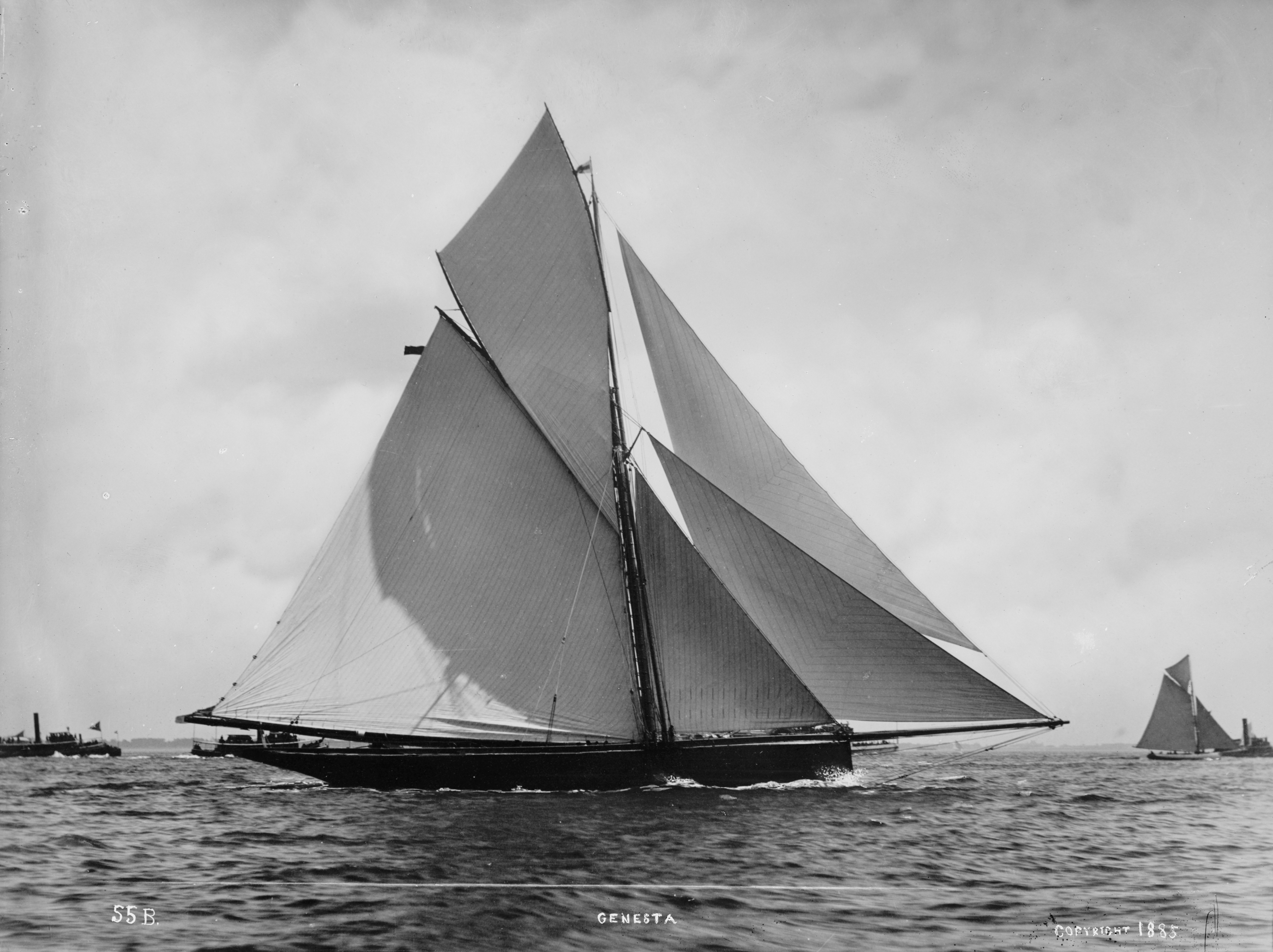
Genesta (1885), the club's first challenger for the America's Cup

In 1851, the club's commodore, visiting the Great Exhibition, issued a challenge for the squadron's £100 Cup for a race around the island. The New York City–based America, representing the New York Yacht Club, triumphed in this race, giving its name to one of the oldest and best-known trophies: the America's Cup. The victory was witnessed by Queen Victoria and the Prince of Wales, later commodore of the club and King Edward VII.

The site is also used as the start of the Round the Island Race which occurs annually.

During the American Civil War Deerhound RYS witnessed the fight between USS Kearsarge and the Confederate cruiser CSS Alabama. Gazelle RYS rescued the Empress Eugénie at the end of the Franco-Prussian War and the squadron yachts supplied British soldiers in the Crimean War.

The German Kaiser brought the 1887 America's Cup challenger Thistle to Cowes in 1892, which encouraged the Prince of Wales to build the royal cutter yacht Britannia, one of the most successful racing yachts of all time.

== The Pavilion ==
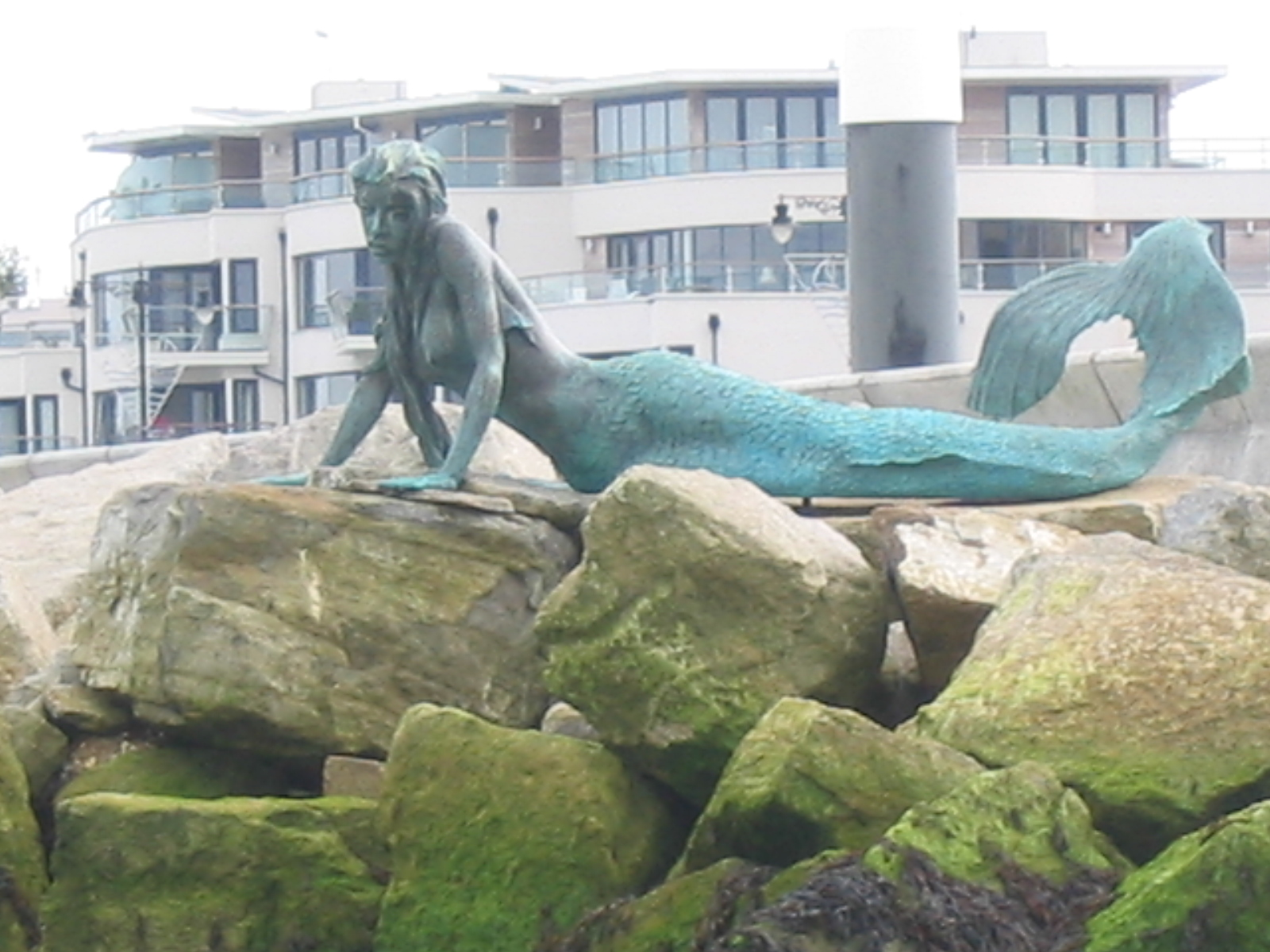
The Bronze Mermaid by Jonathan Wylder on the breakwater of the RYS Haven, which was modelled on the swimmer Sharron Davies

The Pavilion, designed by the architect Thomas Croft, was opened in 2000. This building provides on shore facilities for yachtsmen and their families while allowing the castle to retain its 'country house' ambience.

== See also ==
- Royal Air Squadron
- Royal Automobile Club
