= The Solent =

Strait separating the Isle of Wight from the mainland of England

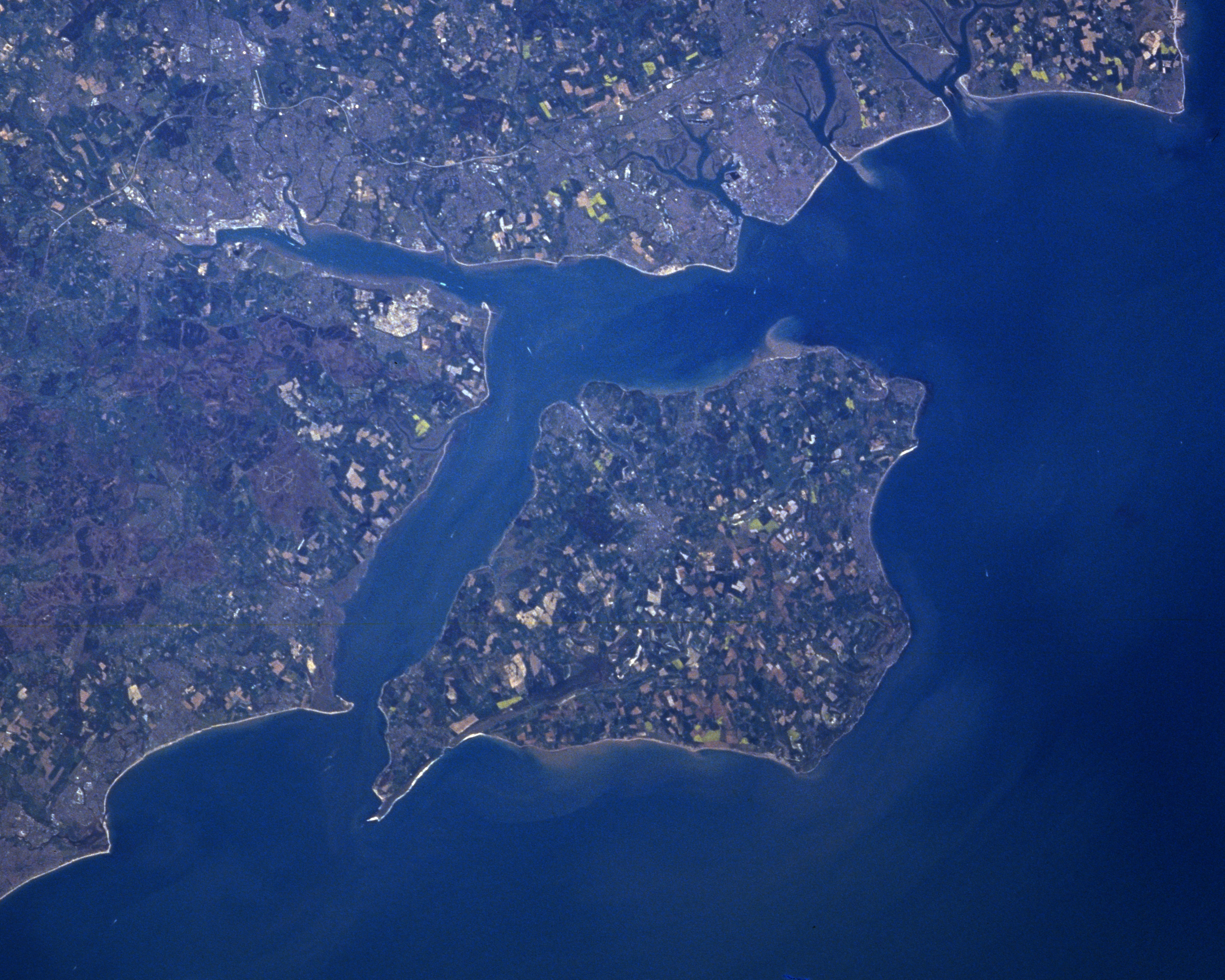
- Satellite image showing the Solent, separating the Isle of Wight from Great Britain

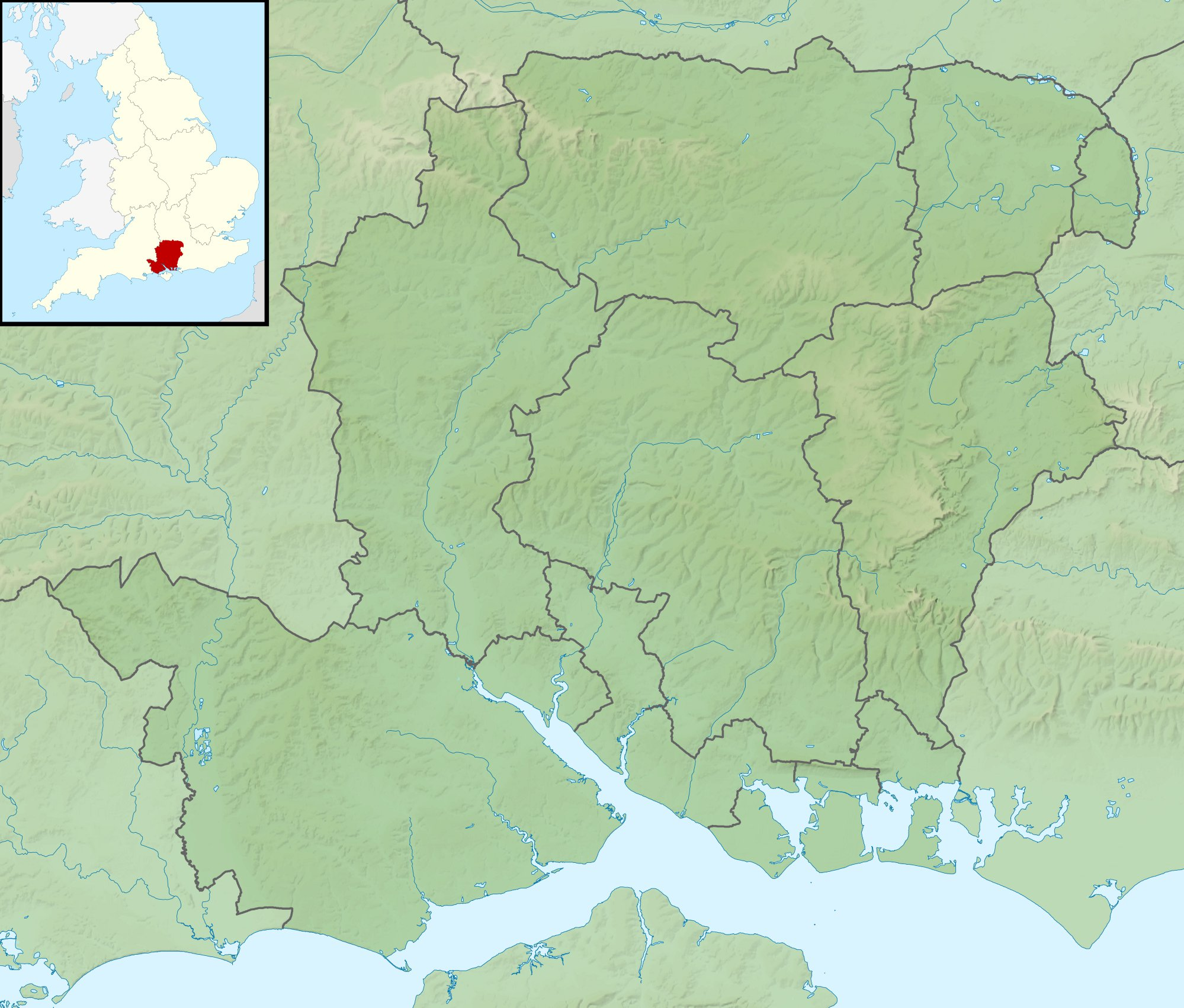
- The Solent within the United Kingdom The Solent within Hampshire
- Location: English Channel
- Coordinates: 50°47′12″N 1°17′42″W
- Type: Strait
- Basin countries: England
- Max. length: 20 miles (32 km)
- Max. width: 5 miles (8.0 km)
- Min. width: 1 mile (1.6 km)
- Settlements: Portsmouth

Designations

Ramsar Wetland
- Official name: Solent and Southampton Water
- Designated: 1 October 1998
- Reference no.: 965

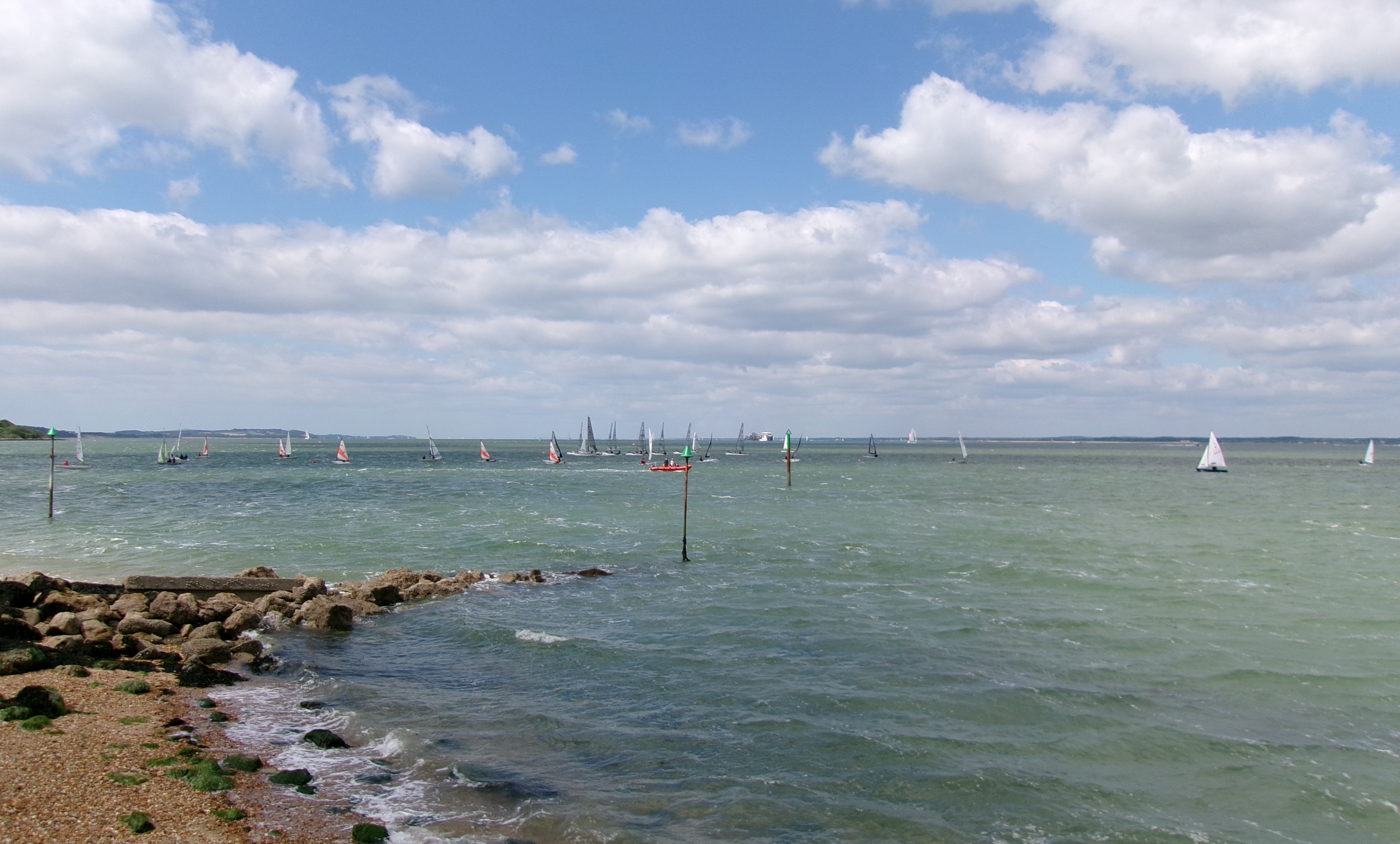
View of the Solent westward from Gurnard, near Cowes, Isle of Wight

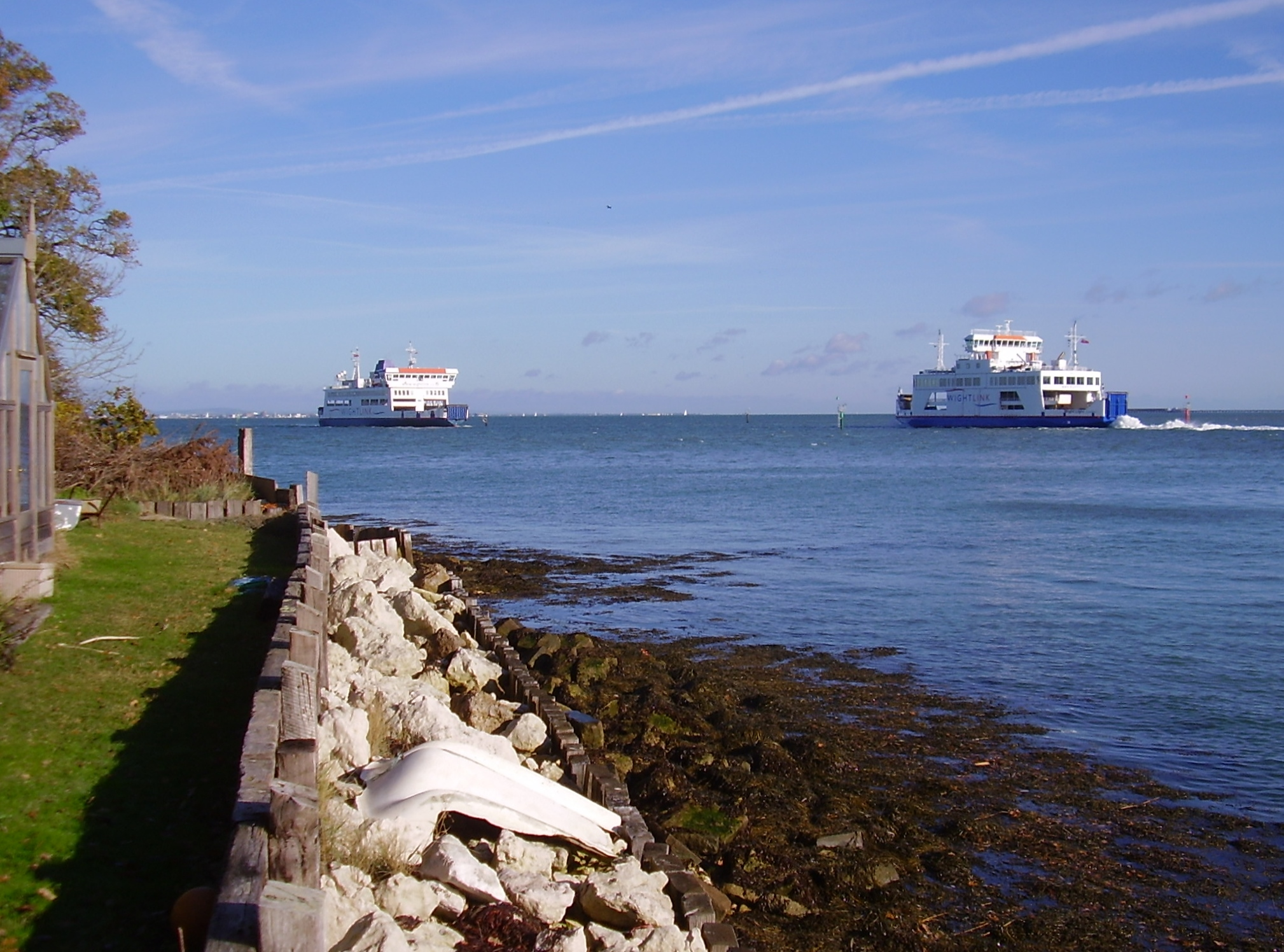
The Solent from Wootton, Isle of Wight, showing Wightlink Fishbourne–Portsmouth ferries crossing.

The Solent (/ˈsoʊlənt/ SOH-lənt) is a strait between the Isle of Wight and mainland Great Britain; the major historic ports of Southampton and Portsmouth lie inland of its shores. It is about 20 miles (32 kilometres) long and varies in width between 2 1/2 and 5 mi (4 and 8 km), although the Hurst Spit which projects 1 1/2 mi (2.4 km) into the Solent narrows the sea crossing between Hurst Castle and Colwell Bay to just over 1 mi (1.6 km).

The Solent is a major shipping lane for passenger, freight and military vessels. It is also an important recreational area for water sports, particularly yachting, hosting the Cowes Week sailing event annually. It is sheltered by the Isle of Wight and has a complex tidal pattern, which has benefited Southampton's success as a port, providing a "double high tide" that extends the tidal window during which deep-draught ships can be handled. Spithead, an area off Gilkicker Point near Gosport, is known as the place where the Royal Navy is traditionally reviewed by the monarch of the day.

The area is of great ecological and landscape importance, particularly because of the coastal and estuarine habitats along its edge. Much of its coastline is designated as a Special Area of Conservation. It is bordered by and forms a part of the character of a number of nationally important protected landscapes including the New Forest National Park, and the Isle of Wight AONB.

It is sometimes erroneously referred to as the “River Solent”; however, the River Solent is actually an extinct river that, during the Pleistocene, was located in southern Hampshire and the Isle of Wight. The Solent itself is not a river – it is a strait.

== Etymology ==
The word predates Old English, and is first recorded in 731 as Soluente (Bede, H.E. 4, 16). This original spelling suggests a possible derivation from the Brittonic element -uente, which has endured throughout the history of Hampshire, as in the Roman city of Venta Belgarum (Latinised as Venta), the post-Roman kingdom of Y Went, and the modern name of Winchester.

It later appears in Anglo-Saxon records as Solentan.

A pre-Celtic and supposedly Semitic root meaning "free-standing rock" has also been suggested as a possible description of the cliffs marking the western approach of the strait. This Semitic origin may be a relic of the Phoenician traders who are believed by some to have sailed to Britain from the Mediterranean as part of the ancient tin trade.

An Indo-European root (as opposed to Semitic) is preferred by Richard Coates.

Another suggestion is that the name may reflect the number of Northern Gannets (previously known as Solans or the Solan Goose) along the coast.

== Geology ==
Originally a river valley, the Solent has gradually widened and deepened over many thousands of years. The River Frome was the source of the River Solent, with four other rivers—the Rivers Avon, Hamble, Itchen and Test—being tributaries of it. Seismic sounding has shown that, when the sea level was lower, the River Solent incised its bed to a depth of at least 46 metres (151 ft) below current Ordnance Datum.

The Purbeck Ball Clay contains kaolinite and mica, showing that in the Lutetian stage of the Eocene water from a granite area, probably Dartmoor, flowed into the River Solent.

Seabed survey shows that when the sea level was lower in the Ice Age the River Solent continued the line of the eastern Solent (Spithead) to a point roughly due east of the east end of the Isle of Wight and due south of a point about 3 kilometres (2 mi) west of Selsey Bill, and then south-south-west for about 30 kilometres (19 mi), and then south for about 14 kilometres (9 mi), and then joined the main river flowing down the dry bed of the English Channel.

During the Ice Age, meanders of the Solent's tributaries became incised: for example, an incised meander of the River Test is buried under reclaimed land under the Westquay shopping centre, near Southampton docks;

Since the retreat of the most recent glaciation, the South East of England, like the Netherlands, has been steadily and slowly sinking through historic time due to forebulge sinking.

In 2008 a new theory—that the Solent was originally a lagoon—was reported in the Southern Daily Echo by Garry Momber from the Hampshire and Wight Trust for Maritime Archaeology.

The Isle of Wight was formerly contiguous with the Isle of Purbeck in Dorset—the Needles on Wight and Old Harry Rocks on Purbeck are the last remnant of this connection.

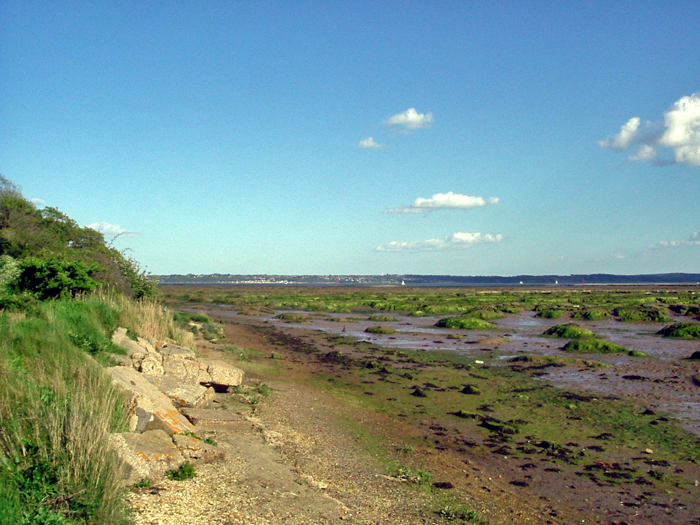
Salt marsh near Lepe Country Park, with the Isle of Wight in the distance

Ten thousand years ago a band of relatively resistant chalk rock, part of the Southern England Chalk Formation, ran from the Isle of Purbeck area of south Dorset to the eastern end of Isle of Wight, parallel to the South Downs. Inland behind the chalk were less resistant sands, clays and gravels. Through these weak soils and rocks ran many rivers, from the Dorset Frome in the west and including the Stour, Beaulieu River, Test, Itchen and Hamble, which created a large estuary flowing west to east and into the English Channel at the eastern end of the present Solent. This great estuary ran through a wooded valley and is now referred to as the Solent River.

When glaciers covering more northern latitudes melted at the end of the last ice age, two things happened to create the Solent. Firstly, a great amount of flood water ran into the Solent River and its tributaries, carving the estuary deeper. Secondly, post-glacial rebound after the removal of the weight of ice over Scotland caused the island of Great Britain to tilt about an east–west axis, because isostatic rebound in Scotland and Scandinavia is pulling mantle rock out from under the Netherlands and south England: this is forebulge sinking.

Over thousands of years, the land sank in the south (a process still continuing) to submerge many valleys creating today's characteristic rias, such as Southampton Water and Poole Harbour, as well as submerging the Solent. The estuary of the Solent River was gradually flooded, and eventually the Isle of Wight became separated from the mainland as the chalk ridge between The Needles on the island and Old Harry Rocks on the mainland was eroded. This is thought to have happened about 7,500 years ago.

The process of coastal change is still continuing, with the soft cliffs on some parts of the Solent, such as Fort Victoria, constantly eroding, whilst other parts, such as Ryde Sands, are accreting.

The Solent is a comparatively shallow stretch of tidal water. It has an unusual double tide that is both favourable and hazardous to maritime activities with its strong tidal movements and quickly changing sea states.

Coupled with the above, the Solent is renowned for its large volume of vessel usage, thus resulting in one of the highest density of declared lifeboat stations in the world. This includes six RNLI (e.g. Calshot and Cowes) and five independently run stations (e.g. Hamble Lifeboat and Gosport and Fareham Inshore Rescue Service).

== History ==
Remains of human habitation have been found from the prehistoric, Roman, and Saxon eras, showing that humans retreated towards progressively higher ground over these periods. Offshore from Bouldnor, Isle of Wight, divers have found at 11 metres (36 ft) depth the submerged remains of a wooden building that was built there on land around 6000 BC when the sea level was lower and the land was higher.

There is an early Norman period report that much land on the south of Hayling Island was lost to sea flood. South of Hayling Island in the Solent is a deposit of stones, which scuba divers found to be the remains of a stone building, probably a church. There is an old report that this church was formerly in the middle of Hayling Island. If similar amounts of land have been lost on other parts of the Solent shore, the Solent was likely to have been much narrower in Roman times, and it is possible to believe Diodorus Siculus's report that in his time men could wade to the Isle of Wight at low tide.

In the early 16th century, Henry VIII built an extensive set of coastal defences at each end of the Solent, part of his Device Forts, effectively controlling access to east and west. In 1545, a naval battle was fought in the Solent between English and French naval forces. The battle was inconclusive with no significant losses other than Henry VIII's flagship, the Mary Rose, which foundered and sank while making a sharp turn. From a total crew of over 400 (some estimates have suggested as many as 700), fewer than 35 survived the sinking. The remains of the Mary Rose were discovered at the bottom of the Solent by a salvage project in 1971 and were successfully salvaged in 1982. The remains of the hull and a large number of artefacts can be seen in the Mary Rose Museum located in the Portsmouth Historic Dockyard.

In 1685, King James II narrowly escaped shipwreck while sailing in the Solent. Musician Henry Purcell wrote "They that go down to the sea in ships" to be sung by the extraordinary voice of John Gostling in commemoration of this event. More forts were built on land and at sea in the 19th century. These were generally known as Palmerston Forts.

The Solent was one of two sites for the sailing events at the 1908 Summer Olympics. The Solent became the departure area of the ill-fated ocean liner, Titanic, in April 1912.

A bank in the centre of the Solent, Bramble Bank, is exposed at low water at spring tide. This, combined with the unique tidal patterns in the area, makes navigation challenging. There is an annual cricket match on Bramble Bank during the lowest tide of the year, but games are often cut short by rising tide.

According to the BBC, the 1/2 mi (800 m) tide at Ryde gives a major advantage to hovercraft which can travel right up a beach and the Solent is the only place in Western Europe where there is a regular passenger service. The operator, Hovertravel, claims it is the world's only commercial passenger hovercraft. It celebrated 50 years of operation in 2015.

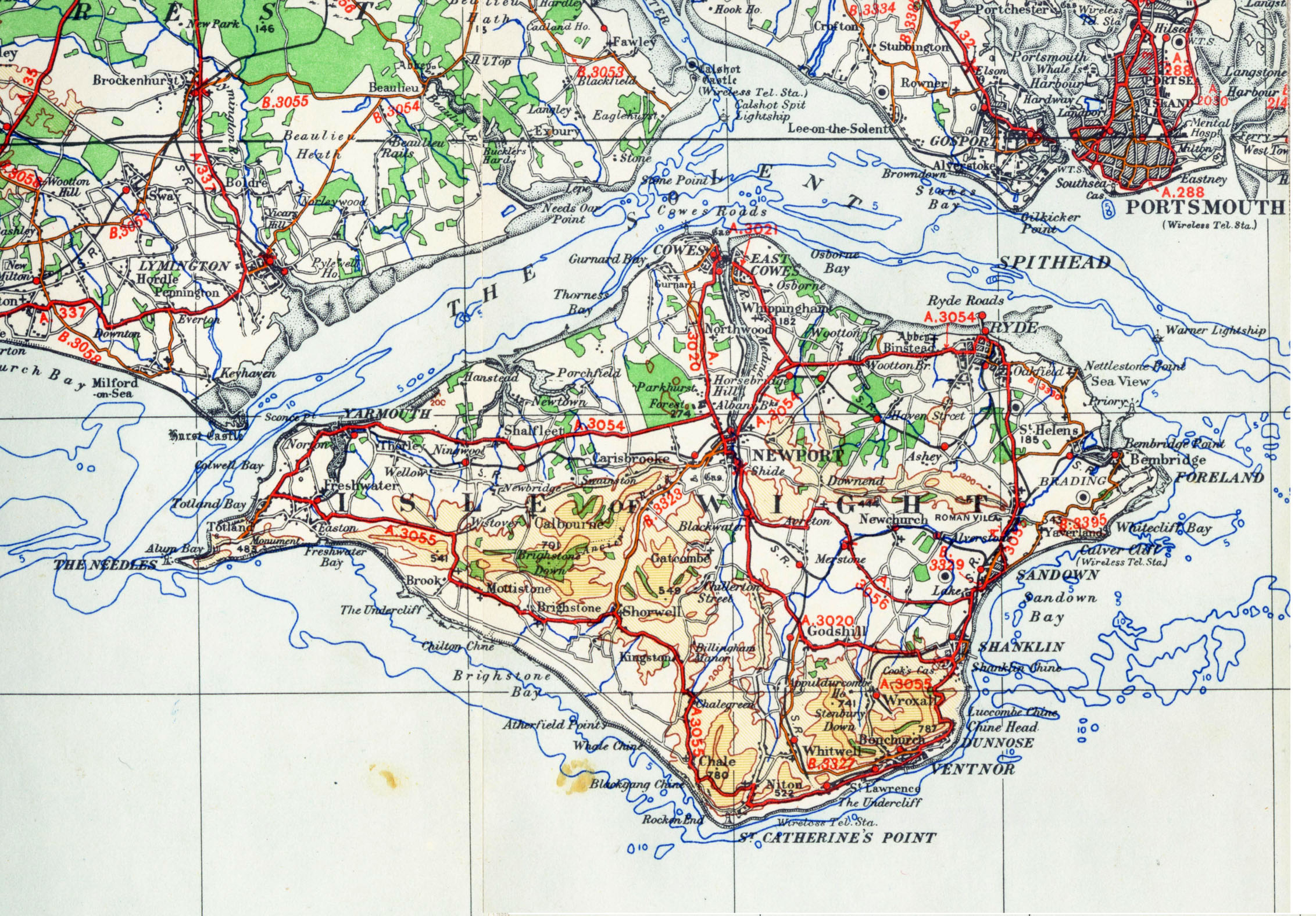
A map of the Solent and surrounding areas from 1945

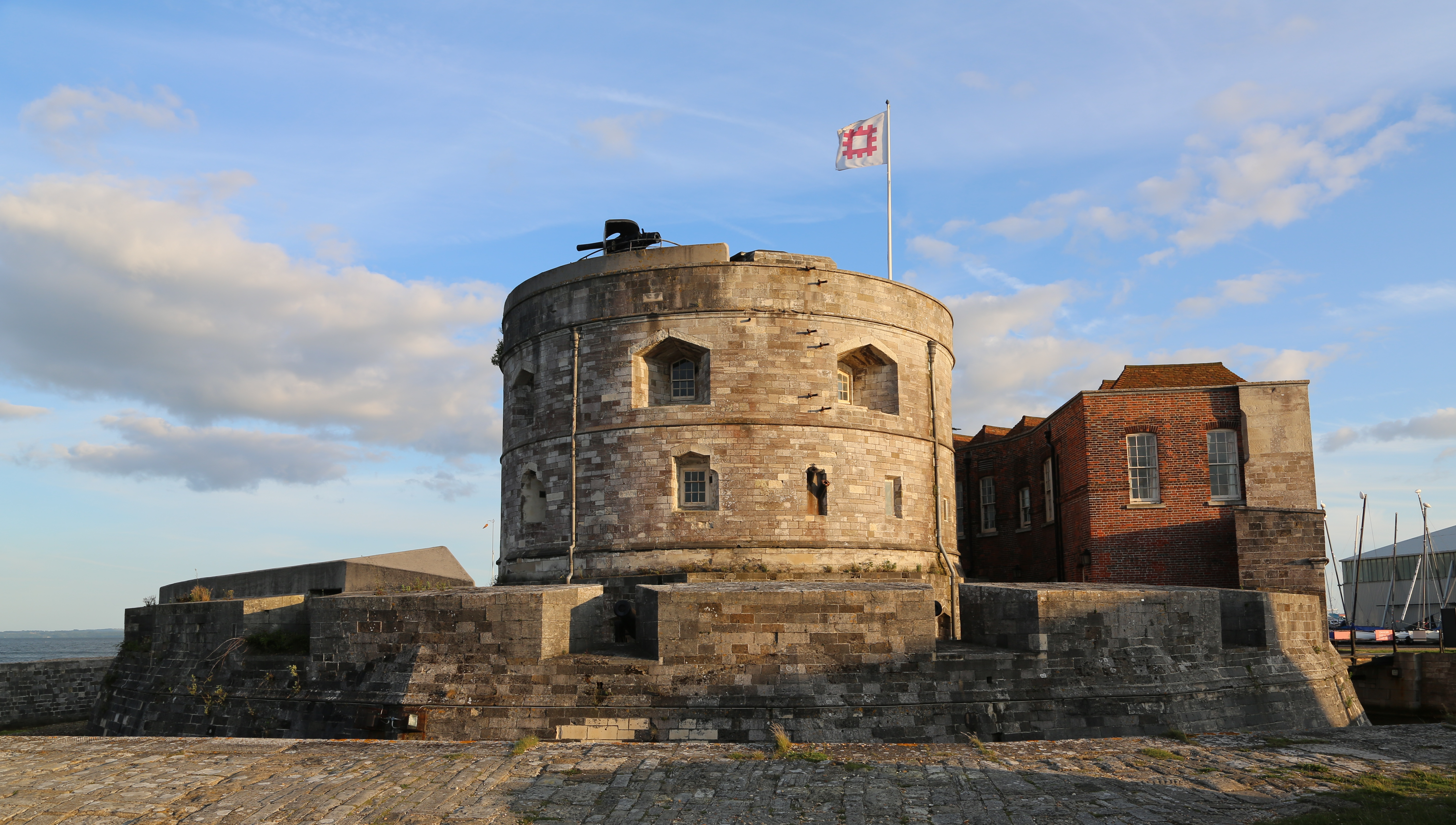
Calshot Castle protected the mouth of Southampton Water

== See also ==
- Ports and harbours of the Solent
- Portsmouth Harbour
- Solent bridge
