= Vereker =

Vereker is a surname. Notable people with the surname include:

- Charles Vereker, 2nd Viscount Gort (1768–1842), Irish soldier and politician
- Colin Leopold Prendergast Vereker, 8th Viscount Gort (1916–1995), peer and Isle of Man politician
- Foley Charles Prendergast Vereker (1850–1900), Royal Navy officer and hydrographic surveyor
- Hugh Vereker, secretive novelist in Henry James's The Figure in the Carpet (1896)
- Gordon Vereker (1889–1976), British diplomat
- John Prendergast Vereker, 3rd Viscount Gort (1790–1865), peer and politician
- John Gage Prendergast Vereker, 5th Viscount Gort (1849–1902), peer
- John Standish Surtees Prendergast Vereker, 6th Viscount Gort (1886–1946), peer and senior British Army officer
- John Michael Medlicott Vereker (born 1944), British civil servant and Governor of Bermuda
- Julian Charles Prendergast Vereker (1945–2000), British designer of hi-fi audio equipment
- Standish Robert Gage Prendergast Vereker, 7th Viscount Gort (1888–1975), peer
- John James "Tommy" Vereker (1893–1974), American baseball player

== See also ==
- Vereker Monteith Hamilton (1856–1931), Scottish artist of military and historical works
- Viscount Gort
- Vereker, Ontario, town in southwestern Ontario, Canada
