= East Cowes Castle =

Home of British architect John Nash

Coordinates: 50°45′25″N 1°16′51″W

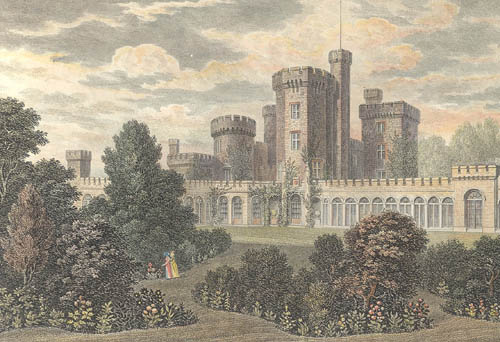
East Cowes Castle, 1824

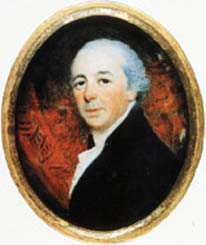
John Nash

East Cowes Castle, located in East Cowes, was the home of architect John Nash between its completion and his death in 1835. Nash himself was the designer of the site, and began construction as early as 1798. It was completed in 1800 and was said to have been built at unlimited expense. Nash was finally interred in the grounds.

The structure gained renown for its complex castellation, its gothic-style turrets and towers, which were built in the style of the period of Edward VI, and for the notable individuals who came to be Nash's guests there, including the Prince Regent, who went on to become King George IV and J. M. W. Turner, who painted a picture of the location.

On Nash's death, the estate was sold to the Earl of Shannon who added a lodge at the south of the estate. It was then briefly held by the politician, George Tudor, before being acquired by the Viscount Gort family, who held it until 1934.

The castle was requisitioned by the War Office during the Second World War, under whose use the condition of the building suffered greatly and owing to subsequent neglect and deterioration, the castle was demolished in 1963. The castle's gatehouse, North Lodge and an original icehouse survive and the castle's clock remains on display at the Carisbrooke Castle Museum.

Over the next thirty years, housing developments were built over the estate. The estate used to cover the area now bordered by Old Road, New Barn Road, York Avenue and Castle Street.

Although East Cowes Castle no longer exists, there is an exact copy of the original castle called Lough Cutra Castle, near Gort, County Galway. For the circumstances concerning its creation, see the paragraph below.

== Description ==
The castle apartments, described as a marine mansion in 1842, contained one square and two circular embattled towers. It was said to be lofty and expensively finished, containing a dining room, drawing room, a library, a billiard room, an octagon library, numerous principal and secondary bedchambers, servants apartments, offices of every description, with ample stabling and coachhouses. There were also splendid conservatories, a picture gallery, gardens of superior order, hothouses and five commodious detached residences.

The grounds were laid out with the help of Humphry Repton, the famous landscape designer, who also designed the gardens for the nearby Norris Castle. They were said to be of around 43 acres in 1842, but reached 74 acres by 1934. They were beautifully undulated, with gardens, a gardener's cottage, two lodges and paddocks, laid out in the 'first style', with terraces embellished with noble timber plantations of luxuriant growth, through which walks and carriage drives of considerable extent had been cut. There was also a castle farm.

The castle also had its own icehouse, which still survives in Sylvan Avenue. There was also a round, brick-lined pond at the corner of Old Road and New Barn Road, to supply its ice in the winter-time. Largely underground, the icehouse was designed in such a way that even throughout the summer, the ice would not melt.

The castle had a battery of eight guns, from which Royal Salutes were often fired, when the Royal Yacht was visiting Cowes.

== Lough Cutra Castle ==
This exact copy of the original East Cowes Castle was built on Lough Cutra, County Galway in 1814. As described, East Cowes Castle was originally designed, built and owned by the famous architect John Nash, who was the protégé of the Prince Regent, who was to become King George IV.

The circumstances surrounding its creation was that Charles Vereker, 2nd Viscount Gort happened to visit East Cowes Castle, along with the Prince Regent. Viscount Gort said to Nash that he wished he could transport East Cowes Castle to Lough Cutra, a lake near Gort, County Galway. Nash said that he would do it for him, for a price of £50,000; and an agreement was made. Nash therefore built an exact copy of East Cowes Castle there for him, although the cost was finally put at around £70,000.

Lough Cutra Castle became the seat of the Gort family, although they were forced to sell the castle due to the great Irish famine of 1846. However, by a strange turn of events, East Cowes Castle itself eventually came into the ownership of the Gort family, when the Viscount's son, John Vereker, 3rd Viscount Gort, acquired it by marrying Elizabeth Tudor. The story has it that he had no idea that East Cowes Castle was identical to his Lough Cutra Castle, until she took him down to the Isle of Wight to see it. He was said to have been in quite a state of shock when he saw it and was led around the inside, already knowing its layout.

Like East Cowes Castle, Lough Cutra Castle was used to billet troops during the Second World War and like East Cowes Castle, it almost became derelict as a result of it. However, its fate proved to be better and it has now been restored, being quoted as being one of the most remarkable properties in Ireland. It is now occupied and in private ownership, although it can be hired for weddings and other special events.

== Owners of East Cowes Castle ==
=== John Nash (1798 - 1835) ===
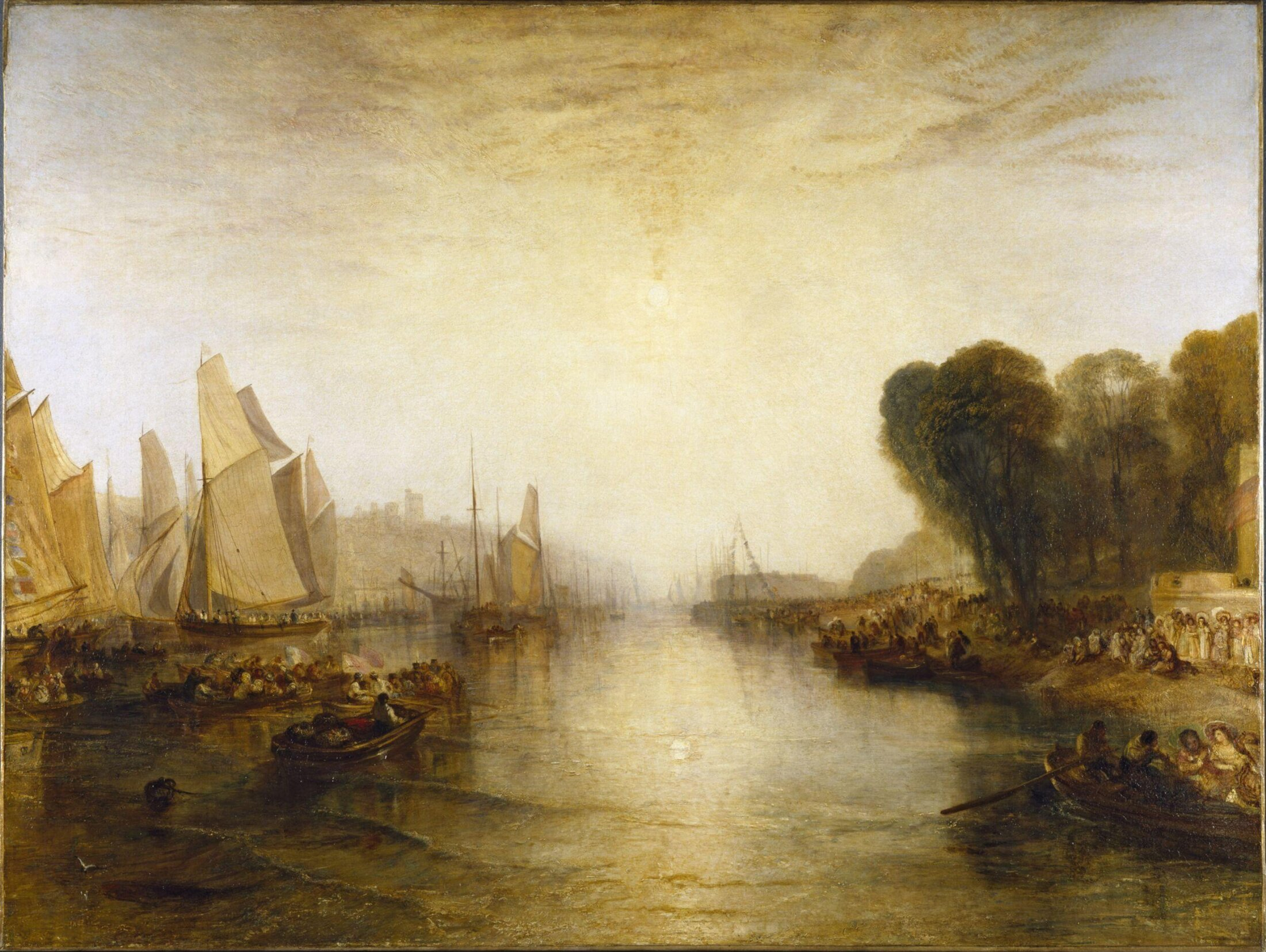
East Cowes Castle by J.M.W. Turner, 1828. Commissioned by Nash, the painting shows the Cowes Regatta with the castle in the distance.

John Nash, the famous architect, designed many famous London buildings, including Buckingham Palace and Marble Arch. Many of his commissions came from the Prince Regent, who would later become King George IV. Nash also designed many Isle of Wight buildings, including Newport Town Hall, Whippingham Church, and Northwood House. He also designed the IW County Club, which is the ornate arched building on the corner of Newport High Street and St James' Square.

In July 1817, the Prince Regent dined at the castle, with four hundred soldiers from Parkhurst Barracks forming a guard of honour.

In October 1818, Lady Anne Romilly, wife of Sir Samuel Romilly, died after a long illness, whilst staying as a guest of John Nash at East Cowes Castle. Her husband was so distraught that he committed suicide just a few days later in his London home, by cutting his own throat.

In 1819, just six months before his coronation as King George IV, the Prince Regent visited Nash again at East Cowes Castle, whilst touring on the Royal Yacht. In 1825, the Duke and the Duchess of Cambridge stayed at East Cowes Castle. In 1827 the artist J.M.W. Turner stayed as a guest of Nash where and attended the Cowes Regatta. He subsequently produced two pictures commissioned by Nash including East Cowes Castle.

In August 1830, the Dauphiness and Duchess De Berri, accompanying the expatriated King of France, visited East Cowes Castle. The king had abdicated on 2 August and left France for England on 16 August, when it seemed that their safety was in jeopardy from angry mobs of French citizens. One of their first ports of call was Cowes and East Cowes. The Princesses were said to be charmed by the scenery of the island, although they complained of their 'stinted' lodgings at the Fountain Hotel.

Nash lead an opulent lifestyle, entertaining important guests and royalty. However, in his later life, he was to fall out of favour and the spiraling costs of his project on Buckingham Palace was partly to do with this. The consequence of this, was that he never received the honours that might otherwise been bestowed upon him.

The number of commissions he received dwindled and he got more and more into debt. It was reported that he died a pauper in 1835, after a long illness, leaving his widow to pay off his enormous debts. His furious creditors apparently went to East Cowes Castle, demanding his body. It was therefore taken to St James's Church, East Cowes in the dead of night for the funeral service. The castle and all of its contents were quickly sold in a number of auctions. Six years later, his executors were finally able to pay off his remaining debts, which even at that time were put at £15,000.

=== The Right Honourable Henry Boyle, 3rd Earl of Shannon (1836 - 1842) ===
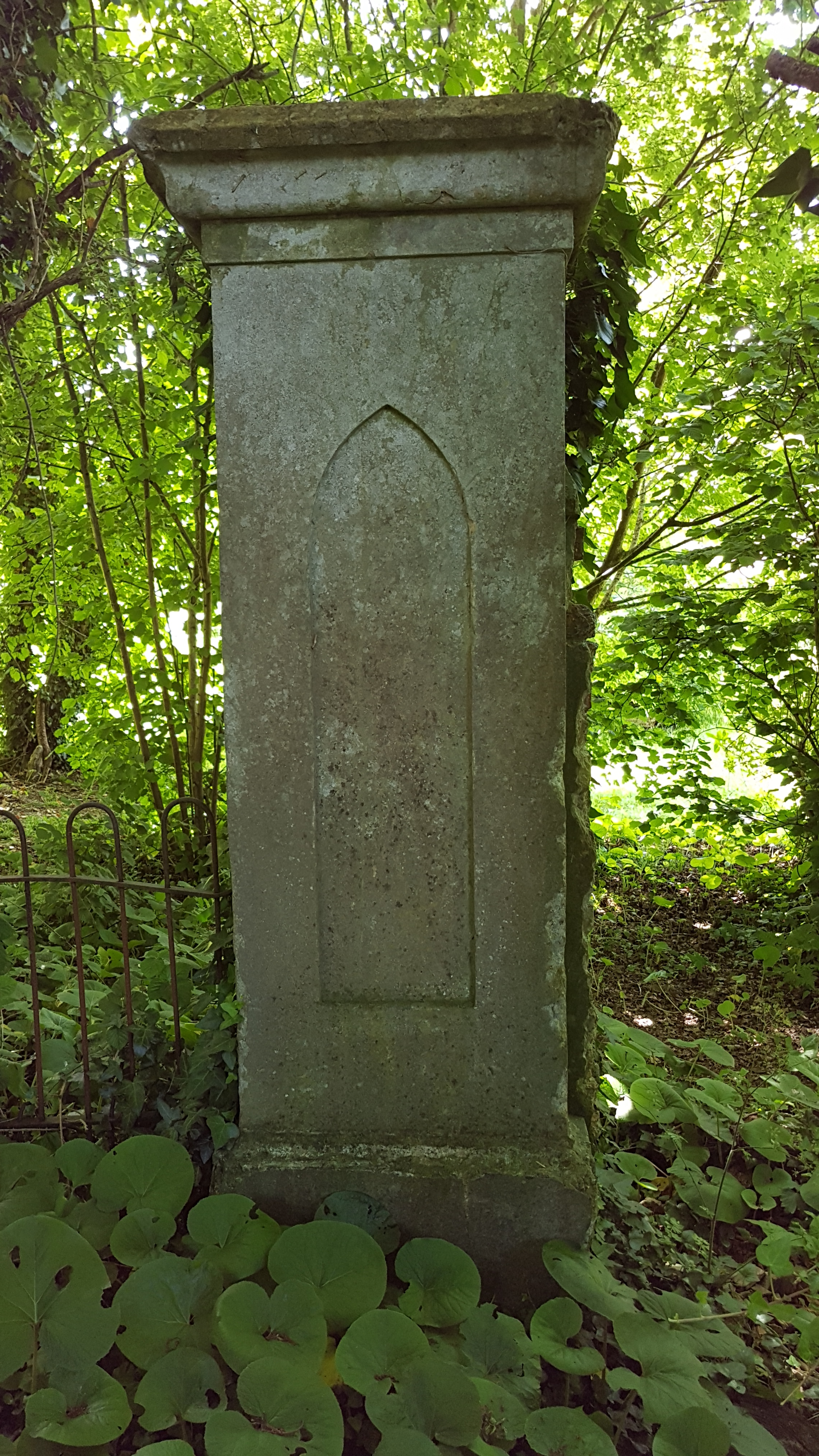
Surviving pillar from the South Lodge gatehouse.

Henry Boyle, 3rd Earl of Shannon KP, PC (Ire) bought East Cowes Castle and its furniture in February 1836 for twenty thousand guineas. He was an Irish career politician who served in the Parliament of Ireland and the Parliament of the United Kingdom. He married Sarah Hyde in 1798 and had twelve children. His heir, Richard Boyle, 4th Earl of Shannon had recently married the daughter of Lord George Seymour, the owner of nearby Norris Castle.

Boyle was a Member of Parliament for a number of Irish constituencies. He became a Knight, Order of St. Patrick in 1808 and was Clerk of Pells in Ireland between 1808 and 1822. He also became a Privy Councillor and as well as being Earl of Shannon, he was also Viscount Boyle of Bandon, 2nd Baron Carleton and 3rd Baron of Castle Martyr. He held the office of Lord-Lieutenant and Custos rotulorum of County Cork between 1831 and 1842.

Under the Earl's ownership, the castle became known as Shannon's Castle. He built the impressive South Lodge gatehouse to the castle, in a very different style to the other North Lodge gatehouse. Each wing of the lodge was two stories high, with an archway for carriages to drive through. There was a tunnel linking two courtyards and a tiled passageway linking two basement rooms. A mock portcullis hung over the arch and either side of the gatehouse were railings and pillars, one of which still remains. The gatehouse was demolished around 1965.

In April 1836, the Earl of Shannon sold at auction John Nash's choice wines from the East Cowes Castle cellar.

In May 1837, the Earl was reported to be dangerously ill from the bursting of a blood vessel. The report said that he had been thrown from his horse many months earlier and had not been well since. In August 1837, the Dowager Queen Adelaide stayed at East Cowes Castle for some time to recuperate from a serious illness, after her physicians felt that the mild sea air would help her convalescence. She was the widow of King William IV and the Australian city of Adelaide was named after her. When Queen Victoria was proclaimed Queen, it was subject to the proviso that Queen Adelaide was not pregnant at the time.

In October 1838, the Earl was again reported to be dangerously ill and in 1841, he was prevented from visiting the castle, due to the delicate state of his health. The Earl of Shannon died at the age of 70 in April 1842, after his long and serious illness. He had been receiving a pension of £3,133 per year from his abolished office as clerk of the pells in Ireland.

Following the 3rd Earl's death, his son shipped all of the castle's "splendid furniture and appointments" back to the family seat in Castlemartyr, County Cork, so that the 'marine villa' could be let out. For some years, the castle was let to Nathaniel Barwell Esq, a gentleman of 'great opulence'.

In 1844, a steeple chase challenge was made between Barwell's horse and a Mr Jacobs of Chale's chestnut. The winner was the first horse to reach the gate of the newly built racecourse. The race was won by Mr Barwell.

In 1847, it was confidently reported that the castle had been sold to the Queen Dowager, who had stayed there to recuperate in 1837. However, this was soon found to be incorrect. The following year it was reported that the Marquis of Conyngham was trying to buy the estate for his family. Shortly afterwards it was reported that the exiled former King of France, the Count de Neuilly had leased the castle for a term, of several years.

In 1852, the castle was occupied by Mr Charles Sawyer esq.

=== Mr George and Mrs Elizabeth Mary Tudor (1853 - 1861) ===
It was reported that the castle was finally sold in 1853 for £12,500, considerably less than its earlier sale in 1836. George Tudor was a Member of parliament for Barnstaple in 1830. However, he did not have long to enjoy the castle, dying in 1857. His widow, Elizabeth Mary Tudor, was the only daughter and heiress of Mr John Jones esq. She remained at the castle, along with continuing to own their main residence at No. 1, Portman Square, London.

In 1855, during a severe thunder storm, a bolt of lightning hit the castle and entered one of the rooms. The only damage caused was the breaking of three dozen panes of glass and scaring the plumbers and workmen working their out of their wits.

=== The Right Honourable Viscount Gort and Lady Elizabeth Mary Gort (1861 - 1880) ===
In 1861, John Vereker, 3rd Viscount Gort on marrying the widowed Mrs Tudor, whom he had met in Paris, became the new lord of East Cowes Castle. He died in 1865, at the age of 75.

Gort was Member of Parliament for Limerick from 1817 to 1820. He was also Mayor of Limerick between 1831 and 1832. He became the 3rd Viscount Gort of County Galway and the 3rd Baron Kiltarton of Gort. He was also Irish representative peer between June 1865 and October 1865.

In January 1876, Dowager Viscountess Gort was visited at East Cowes Castle by Queen Victoria and the Princess Beatrice. Prince Leopold was also in attendance.

Lady Gort died in October 1880 at the age of 89, after a few days illness. She left £140,000 in her will. The majority of her estate went to her stepson, Standish Vereker, 4th Viscount Gort, although she also left £1,000 to the parish of East Cowes, to found a coal, food and clothing fund, to be distributed to the poor of the parish at Christmas.

=== Standish Prendergast Vereker, 4th Viscount Gort (1880 - 1895) ===
Inheriting the castle in 1880, the 4th Viscount Gort was married to Caroline Harriet Gage, daughter of Henry Gage, 4th Viscount Gage. He held the office of High Sheriff in 1843 and gained the rank of Honorary Colonel in the service of the 4th Brigade, South Irish Division, Royal Artillery. He also held the office of Justice of the Peace for County Galway and succeeded as the 4th Baron Kiltarton of Gort and 4th Viscount Gort.

Standish Vereker had some major additions made to the castle in 1883. The entrance porch was reduced in size and a lot of the walling removed. The kitchens were extended and a new bakery built, with a room above it. A circular tower was constructed as a separate building and a new courtyard formed with new walling, enclosing some other new buildings. The work was done to a high standard, with matching materials used throughout. Shortly afterwards East Cowes Castle Farm was constructed on the estate, which consisted of a red brick cottage, a dairy and various farm outbuildings.

=== John Gage Prendergast Vereker, 5th Viscount Gort (1895 – 1902) ===
It was reported in 1895 that the castle had been given as a Christmas gift to John Vereker, by his father. He later became 5th Viscount Gort and it was intended that East Cowes Castle would become his seaside residence. His wife, Eleanor Surtees, was the heiress of novelist Robert Smith Surtees and owner of Hamsterley Hall, near Newcastle Upon Tyne.

Like his father, Vereker was in the service of the 4th Brigade, South Irish Division, Royal Artillery, gaining the rank of captain. He also held the office of Justice of the Peace for the Isle of Wight, as well as Justice of the Peace for County Durham. He succeeded as the 5th Viscount Gort as well as the 5th Baron Kiltarton of Gort.

John Gort died in 1902, leaving £79,000 in his will. This included giving his wife Eleanor, use of East Cowes Castle for the rest of her life, although ownership of the castle was to be held in trust for his second son, the future 7th Viscount Gort. He left his Tottenham Court Road estate and his house at No. 1, Portman Square, London in trust for his eldest son, the 6th Viscount Gort.

Eleanor Gort retained ownership of Hamsterley Hall in her own right. She went on to marry Colonel Starling Meux Benson, formerly of the 17th Lancers, in 1908. Both she and her new husband died in 1933.

=== Dowager Lady Eleanor Gort (1902 - 1934) ===
East Cowes Castle remained under the Control of Lady Gort, held in trust for her children until her death.

Of particular note was her eldest son, 6th Viscount Field Marshal The Right Honourable Viscount Gort VC, GCB, CBE, DSO & Two Bars, MVO, MC, who was a highly decorated war hero. However, his younger brother, Standish Vereker, 7th Viscount Gort MC KStJ, who served under him, was also a war hero.

Upon the death of Lady Eleanor Gort in 1933, the contents of the castle was auctioned in August of that year, on the instructions of her executors. It would seem that despite being held in trust for her children, the castle would never actually legally fall to either of them.

The castle itself was auctioned in November 1934 and sold. The report said that the buyer's name could not be disclosed, but it was mentioned that there was a prospect that the castle could be inhabited again. The following week it was announced that a company was being formed to manage the estate and that the secretary was a Mr R G Burke, with the registered office being 6 Birmingham Road, Cowes, Isle of Wight.

=== Development plans (1934 - 1963) ===
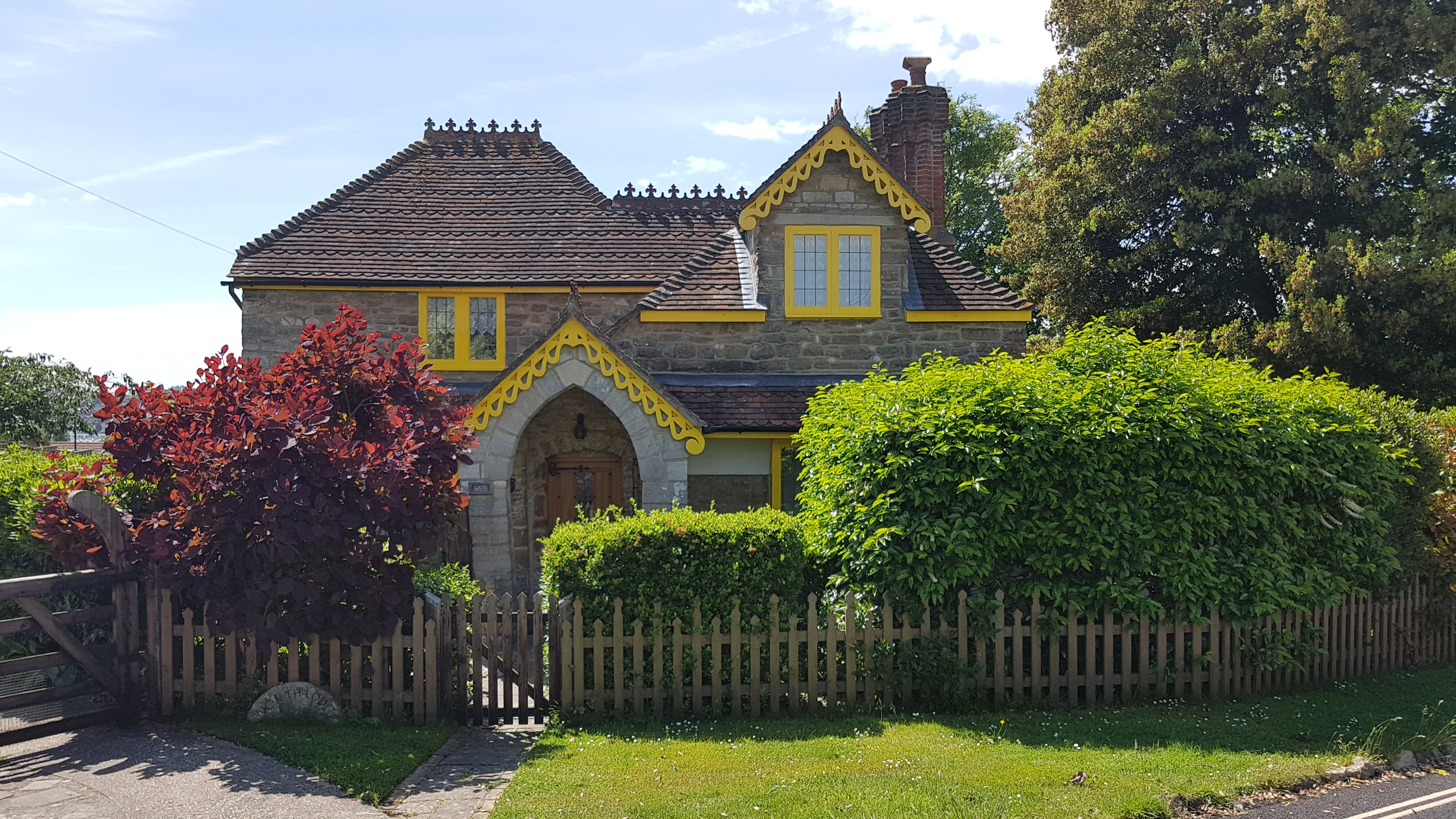
North Lodge, last building of the East Cowes Castle estate.

In 1934, the castle was bought by Cowes Estates LTD, a development company. From that time until the start of the Second World War, the estate was only inhabited by caretakers and its only actual use was for a short time as summer tea gardens for island visitors.

In 1940, during the Second World War, the castle was requisitioned for use by the military, who left it in a serious state of decay. It was used to billet British and Canadian troops of the Free French Canadians, the South Saskatchewans. The grounds were also used as a site for air-raid shelters, with space for 150 people. There are stories of the doors and ornamental panelling being taken down and burnt in the fireplaces, to help warm the freezing soldiers therein.

By 1946, the castle was in a very sorry state, with the lead roofing and floorboards having been sold or taken to patch up bombed local properties. Once rain was able to enter through the roof, serious decay set in. Because of its condition, nobody was prepared to pay for the restoration of the castle.

By 1951, it had been announced that the castle was to be demolished and that by the following summer, its once carefully tended lawns were to be used to grow strawberries. Demolition workers were already stripping the once luxurious castle of its fittings. There were bonfires all over the estate, as more and more of its trees were being up-rooted and burned.

A subsidiary of Cowes Estates called Cowes Growers LTD were responsible for growing the fruit and vegetables. Winter lettuce had already been planted and as well as the plan to plant 10,000 strawberry plants, there were plans to grow raspberries, apples, cucumbers and blackcurrants on the 58 acres. There were originally some plans to save parts of the castle, but these were seen to be impracticable.

In 1958, the ramshackle estate was sold to Mr Arthur Guy for £1,000. He applied for planning permission for a holiday development and 18-hole golf course, which would have saved the castle. However, when his application was refused, he sold the site on to developers, hoping that the castle would still be saved. However, this was not to be.

Ultimately, in 1963, the castle was completely demolished, followed shortly afterwards by the Southgate Lodge. Over the years, housing has been built on most of its grounds, finally ending this estate. The original northern gatehouse to the castle still survives, the North Lodge in Old Road, East Cowes.

Stone taken from the demolition of East Cowes Castle was later used in the rebuilding of West Cowes Castle, the home of the Royal Yacht Squadron.

=== Post demolition (1963 to date) ===
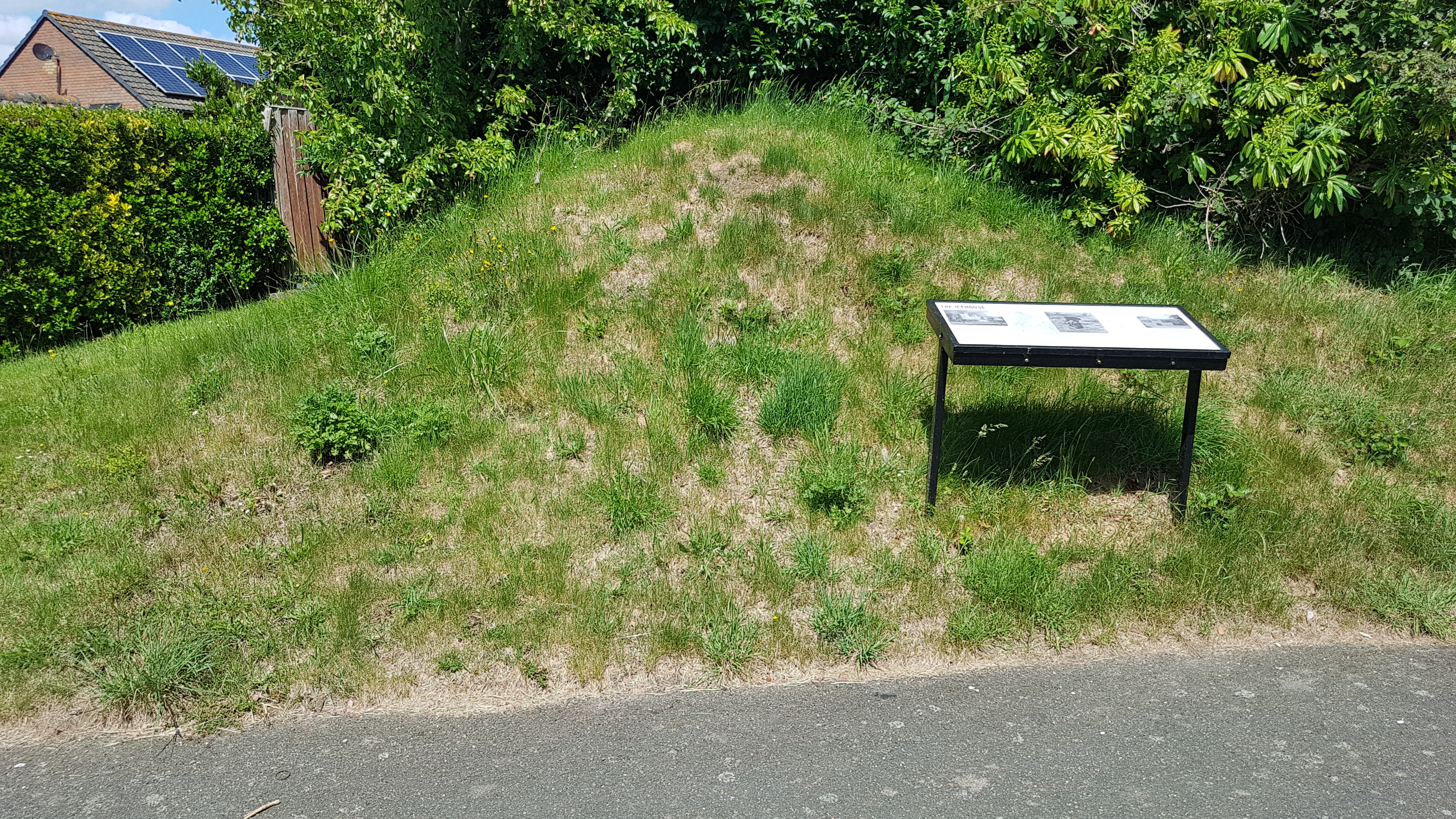
The original icehouse, buried for preservation.

Over the next thirty years, housing developments were built over the estate. These were Sylvan Avenue, Birch Close, Vereker Drive, Hefford Road, John Nash Avenue, Oak Tree Way, Hendy Road, Benton Close, Glossop Close, St James Close and Moon Close.

In 1989, efforts were made to save East Cowes Castle's icehouse, the only other remaining part of the castle's original estate. It was situated in the middle of the new Sylvan Avenue housing development. The bottle shaped brick building, which was about twelve feet high, was buried partially underground, next to one of the brand new buildings. There was a gaping hole in the roof, but the IW Council architect felt that if the hole could be repaired, then the icehouse could indeed be saved. At that time there were said to be twenty icehouses left on the Isle of Wight.

Indeed, the icehouse was preserved, after the IW Council agreed to take responsibility for it in March 1990. It was loosely filled in with chalk, so that the structure would retain its integrity and then buried under a grass mound to preserve it. In this way, it might be possible to reconstruct it properly in the future. There is an information board erected there to explain its history.

In 1997, the clock movement from a square turret in the castle was put on permanent display at Carisbrooke Castle. The clock was built in 1819 by Clerkenwell clockmaker John Moore, who supplied clocks for churches and turrets across the world. It was restored in 1995 to working order.
