= John Vereker =

John Vereker may refer to:

- John Vereker, 3rd Viscount Gort (1790–1865), Irish peer and politician
- John Vereker, 5th Viscount Gort (1849–1902), Anglo-Irish peer, landowner and Army officer
- John Vereker, 6th Viscount Gort (1886–1946), British Army officer
- John Vereker (civil servant) (born 1944), governor of Bermuda
