= Governor Vereker =

Governor Vereker may refer to:

- John Vereker (civil servant) (born 1944), Governor and Commander in Chief of Bermuda from 2002 to 2007
- John Vereker, 6th Viscount Gort (1886–1946), Governor of Gibraltar from 1941 to 1942 and Governor of Malta from 1942 to 1944
