= Pillbox =

Pillbox may refer to:

- Pill organizer, a container for medicine
- Pillbox hat, a woman's hat with a flat crown, straight upright sides, and no brim
- Pillbox (military), concrete dug-in guard posts
- Pillbox affair, a 1939 British political and military controversy
- Pillbox (band)
