= Attorney General Fitzgerald =

Attorney General Fitzgerald may refer to:

- Charles Borromeo Fitzgerald (1865–1913), Attorney-General of Queensland
- John FitzGerald, Baron FitzGerald (1816–1889), Attorney-General of Ireland
- William F. Fitzgerald (1846–1903), Attorney General of California
- William James Fitzgerald (jurist) (1894–1989), Attorney-General of Northern Rhodesia
