= Colin Vereker, 8th Viscount Gort =

Member of the House of Keys

Colin Vereker, 8th Viscount Gort at an exhibition in the Isle of Man in 1953

Colin Leopold Prendergast "Kim" Vereker, 8th Viscount Gort, JP (21 June 1916 – 6 April 1995) was an Irish peer and member of the House of Keys.

== Life ==
Gort was the son of Leopold George Prendergast Vereker and Helen Marjorie Campbell, and the grandson of the Hon. Foley Charles Prendergast Vereker, the second son of the fourth Viscount.

He was educated at Sevenoaks School in Kent. He joined the Royal Navy Volunteer Reserve and fought in World War II, rising to the rank of Lieutenant-Commander and being mentioned in dispatches.

He was a director of Royal Skandia IoM, Invesco Fund Managers IoM, Euronav IoM and Eurofish IoM.

In 1962, Gort was a Justice of the Peace for Castletown in the Isle of Man. Between 1966 and 1971 he was a Member of the House of Keys (MHK), the lower house of the Parliament of the Isle of Man.

He succeeded to the title of Viscount Gort and Baron Kiltarton of Gort on the death of his first cousin once removed, Standish Vereker, 7th Viscount Gort, in 1975.

He married Bettine Mary Mackenzie Green, on 4 July 1946. Gort died in 1995, aged 78. The titles passed to his son, Foley Robert Standish Prendergast Vereker, 9th Viscount Gort (born 1951), who also lives on the Isle of Man.

Peerage of Ireland
Preceded by Standish Vereker	Viscount Gort; 1975–1995	Succeeded by Foley Vereker
