= John Vereker, 5th Viscount Gort =

Anglo-Irish peer, landowner and Army officer

John Gage Prendergast Vereker, 5th Viscount Gort (28 January 1849 – 15 August 1902) was an Anglo-Irish peer, landowner and Army officer.

== Biography ==
Vereker was born in 1849, the son of Standish Vereker, 4th Viscount Gort (1819–1900) by his wife Caroline Harriet Gage, daughter of the 4th Viscount Gage. He was educated at Harrow, and joined the Royal Artillery, where he advanced to captain in the 4th Brigade, South Irish Division.

He acted as British Consul at Cherbourg in 1879. Following his return to the United Kingdom, he was a Justice of the peace for County Durham and for the Isle of Wight, where his father left him the East Cowes Castle in 1895. The castle had been built by the architect John Nash as his own home, and was completed in 1800. It was inherited by the 4th Viscount Gort from his stepmother, whose first husband George Tudor had bought it as a family home.

Vereker took a great interest in scientific and political questions, especially in the religious and educational aspects of political life, and was for many years Chairman of the Durham Diocesan Church Defence Committee.

He succeeded his father as the 5th Viscount Gort in 1900, already in frail health, and died in Homburg only two years later, on 15 August 1902. His remains were interred in East Cowes parish churchyard on 23 August 1902.

== Family ==
Vereker married, in 1885, Eleanor Surtees, daughter and co-heiress of Robert Smith Surtees (1805–1864), by his wife Elizabeth Jane Fenwick. Surtees had left Hamsterley Hall, County Durham to his daughter Eleanor on his death. Lord and Lady Gort had two sons, who both succeeded to the title:

- John Vereker, 6th Viscount Gort (1886–1946)
- Standish Vereker, 7th Viscount Gort (1888–1975)

Lady Gort continued to live at East Cowes Castle after her husband´s death, and remarried, in 1907, Colonel Starling Maux Benson, of the 17th Lancers. Both she and her second husband died in 1933.

== See also ==
East Cowes Castle for more on the family history

Peerage of Ireland
Preceded by Standish Vereker	Viscount Gort; 1st creation 1900–1902	Succeeded by John Vereker
