= Viscount Gort =

Viscountcies in the Peerage of Ireland and (extinct) the United Kingdom

Viscountcy of Gort
- Quarterly: 1st and 4th, Azure on a Chevron Or a Chaplet Vert (Vereker); 2nd and 3rd, Gules a Saltire Vairy Or and Azure (Prendergast)
- Creation date: 16 January 1816
- Creation: First
- Created by: George III
- Peerage: Peerage of Ireland
- First holder: John Prendergast-Smyth, 1st Baron Kiltarton
- Present holder: Foley Robert Standish Prendergast Vereker, 9th Viscount Gort
- Heir apparent: The Hon. Robert Foley Prendergast Vereker
- Subsidiary titles: Baron Kiltarton
- Status: Extant
- Seat: The Coach House

Viscount Gort is the title of two peerages in British and Irish history. Gort is a small town in County Galway in the West of Ireland. The original title was in the Peerage of Ireland and is extant. A viscountcy with the same title as the Irish peerage was then conferred in the Peerage of the United Kingdom to a later Lord Gort. This gave the distinguished descendant a subtle personal change of status, whilst preserving the heritage of the older title. The United Kingdom title, however, became extinct on the death of its recipient, who remains perhaps the most illustrious bearer of either title to date. A post-World War II unqualified reference to "Lord Gort" will almost always be to the sixth viscount.

== Viscount Gort, Peerage of Ireland ==
The title was created in 1816 as an advancement or 'step' for an existing peer. John Prendergast Smyth had already been created Baron Kiltarton of Gort, in the County of Galway, also in the Peerage of Ireland, in 1810. John Prendergast-Smyth, Viscount Gort and Lord Kiltarton, was the nephew of Sir Thomas Prendergast, 2nd Baronet, and had succeeded to the Prendergast estates on the death of this uncle in 1760 (see Prendergast Baronets, of Gort). He was ineligible to inherit the title of his uncle, but the bequest enabled him to develop the status to merit a title of his own, of a higher degree, and subsequently to advance himself higher in the peerage system. Lord Gort had no sons to inherit his two titles but, unusually, he had been able to secure a special remainder both in 1816 and in 1810, the remainder being in favour of his nephew Charles Vereker, the son of his sister Juliana by her marriage with Thomas Vereker.

On the death of John Prendergast-Smyth in the following year, the Gort viscountcy, plus the barony, passed to the Vereker family according to the special remainder. Charles Vereker, the second Viscount, represented Limerick in the House of Commons and sat in the House of Lords as an Irish representative peer from 1824 until his death, in 1842.

John Vereker succeeded his father, both as the third Viscount and as Member of Parliament for Limerick. He was also an Irish Representative Peer in 1865, the year in which he died.

== Viscount Gort, Peerage of the United Kingdom ==
John Vereker, the sixth Viscount, was the great-grandson of his namesake. Following the establishment of the Irish Free State in 1922 the family chose to emigrate and settle in County Durham. This Lord Gort was a distinguished soldier whose personal courage in the First World War was recognised with the highest decoration of the British Empire, the Victoria Cross, plus three further gallantry decorations, before achieving the most senior post in the British Army, Chief of the Imperial General Staff. It was Lord Gort who commanded the BEF in 1939 and his leadership during the disastrous withdrawal from France preserved his reputation at an unhappy time for the nation. He then had another tough appointment, as Governor of Malta in its darkest days, before becoming High Commissioner of British Mandate for Palestine and the Transjordan, itself hardly a rest-cure at this time. His promotion to Field Marshal and the creation of the new Viscountcy at the end of the war was an indicator of his standing as a soldier and imperial administrator. The 1946 title was Viscount Gort, of Hamsterley Hall in the County of Durham, in the Peerage of the United Kingdom. Field Marshal Lord Gort had no living sons and, unlike his own ancestor, did not have a special remainder, so on his death just one month after the creation of the new title, the new viscountcy became extinct, whilst the Irish titles passed to his brother, Standish Vereker.

== The Gort Viscountcy in the modern era ==
Standish Vereker inherited the title from his brother the Field Marshal, the Lord Gort mentioned above. He inherited the Irish viscountcy and barony in 1946. The seventh Viscount had been awarded the temporary office of High Sheriff of Durham in 1934, before he gained the peerage.

On his death in 1975, the titles passed to his first cousin once removed downwards, becoming the eighth Viscount; Colin Vereker was the grandson of Hon. Foley Charles Prendergast Vereker, second son of the fourth Viscount. The eighth Lord Gort lived on the Isle of Man, where he preserved the family tradition of public service as a member of the House of Keys, the lower house of the Parliament of the Isle of Man. In 1995, the titles passed to his son Foley Vereker, the ninth Viscount, who also lives on the Isle of Man.

The family seat is The Coach House, near Castletown, Isle of Man.

== In the Peerage of Ireland ==
=== Viscounts Gort, of Gort (1816) ===
- John Prendergast-Smyth, 1st Viscount Gort (1742–1817)
- Charles Vereker, 2nd Viscount Gort (1768–1842)
- John Prendergast Vereker, 3rd Viscount Gort (1790–1865)
- Standish Prendergast Vereker, 4th Viscount Gort (1819–1900)
- John Gage Prendergast Vereker, 5th Viscount Gort (1849–1902)
- John Standish Surtees Prendergast Vereker, 6th Viscount Gort (1886–1946) without male issue
- Standish Robert Gage Prendergast Vereker, 7th Viscount Gort (1888–1975) without male issue
- Colin Leopold Prendergast Vereker, 8th Viscount Gort (1916–1995)
- Foley Robert Standish Prendergast Vereker, 9th Viscount Gort (b. 1951)

The heir apparent is the present holder's son Hon. Robert Foley Prendergast Vereker (b. 1993)

== In the Peerage of the United Kingdom ==
=== Viscount Gort, of Hamberley Castle (1946) ===
- John Standish Surtees Prendergast Vereker, 6th Viscount Gort (1886–1946)

== Line of succession ==
- John Prendergast Vereker, 3rd Viscount Gort (1790–1865)
  - Standish Prendergast Vereker, 4th Viscount Gort (1819–1900)
    - Captain Hon. Foley Charles Prendergast Vereker (1850–1900)
      - Leopold George Prendergast Vereker (1881–1937)
        - Colin Leopold Prendergast Vereker, 8th Viscount Gort (1916–1995)
          - Foley Robert Standish Prendergast Vereker, 9th Viscount Gort (born 1951)
            - (1) Hon. Robert Foley Prendergast Vereker (b. 1993)
          - (2) Hon. Nicholas Leopold Prendergast Vereker (b. 1954)
      - Maurice Charles Prendergast Vereker (1884–1963)
        - (3) Charles John Prendergast Vereker (b. 1935)
          - (4) Richard John Prendergast Vereker (b. 1978)
          - (5) Nicholas Charles Prendergast Vereker (b. 1982)
            - (6) Rupert Edward Prendergast Vereker (b. 2016)
        - (7) Jeffrey Maurice Prendergast Vereker (b. 1940)
          - (8) Edward Foley Prendergast Vereker (b. 1973)
  - Hon. John Prendergast Vereker (1822–1891)
    - Major John Medlicott Vereker (1863–1940)
      - Captain Stanley Lloyd Medlicott Vereker (1899–1967)
        - (9) John Stanley Herbert Medlicott Vereker (b. 1927)
          - (10) Rupert David Peregrine Medlicott Vereker (b. 1957)
            - (11) Frederick James Herbert Medlicott Vereker (b. 1990)
            - (12) Jack Rupert William Medlicott Vereker (b. 1992)
          - (13) Hugo Dominic Charles Medlicott Vereker (b. 1961)
        - (14) David William Leslie Medlicott Vereker (b. 1930)
          - (15) William David Lloyd Medlicott Vereker (b. 1966)
          - (16) Henry Alan Charles Medlicott Vereker (b. 1969)
      - Commander Charles William Medlicott Vereker (1903–1995)
        - Peter William Medlicott Vereker (1939–2001)
          - (17) Connel Charles Medlicott Vereker (b. 1971)
          - (18) Toby John Medlicott Vereker (b. 1973)
          - (19) Rory James Medlicott Vereker (b. 1981)
        - (20) Sir John Michael Medlicott Vereker (b. 1944)
  - Hon. Henry Prendergast Vereker (1824–1904)
    - Major Charles Granville Vereker (1869–1947)
      - (21) Neville Henry Prendergast Vereker (b. 1934)
        - (22) John Charles Prendergast Vereker (b. 1975)
        - (23) Richard Neville Forester Vereker (b. 1977)

== See also ==
- Prendergast Baronets, of Gort
- Ian Standish Monteith Hamilton and Vereker Monteith Hamilton, grandsons of the third Viscount Gort
- John Michael Medlicott Vereker and Julian Charles Prendergast Vereker, great-great-grandsons of the third Viscount Gort
