= Leslie Hore-Belisha =

British politician (1893–1957)

The Right Honourable The Lord Hore-Belisha PC
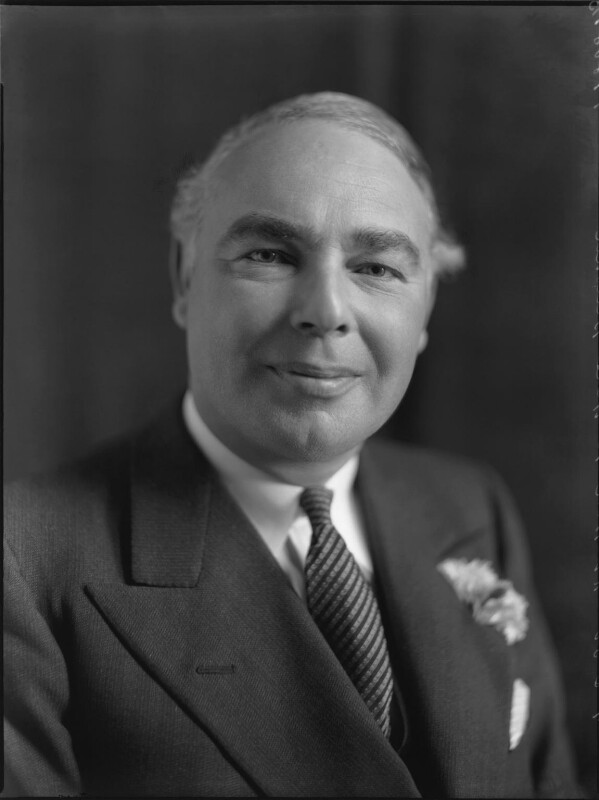
- Hore-Belisha in 1935

Secretary of State for War
- In office 28 May 1937 – 5 January 1940
- Prime Minister: Neville Chamberlain
- Preceded by: Duff Cooper
- Succeeded by: Hon. Oliver Stanley

Minister of Transport
- In office 29 June 1934 – 28 May 1937
- Prime Minister: Ramsay MacDonald; Stanley Baldwin
- Preceded by: Hon. Oliver Stanley
- Succeeded by: Leslie Burgin

Financial Secretary to the Treasury
- In office 29 September 1932 – 29 June 1934
- Prime Minister: Ramsay MacDonald
- Preceded by: Walter Elliot
- Succeeded by: Duff Cooper

Member of Parliament for Plymouth Devonport
- In office 6 December 1923 – 15 June 1945
- Preceded by: Clement Kinloch-Cooke
- Succeeded by: Michael Foot

Personal details
- Born: Isaac Leslie Belisha; 7 September 1893 Hampstead, London, England
- Died: 16 February 1957 (aged 63) Reims, France
- Party: Liberal Party; Liberal National
- Spouse: Cynthia Elliot (m. 1944)
- Education: St John's College, Oxford

Isaac Leslie Hore-Belisha, 1st Baron Hore-Belisha (/ˈhɔːr bəˈliːʃə/; 7 September 1893 – 16 February 1957) was a British politician, at first a member of the Liberal Party, later of the Liberal Nationals, and eventually of the Conservative Party, who served as a Member of Parliament (MP) and Cabinet Minister. He proved highly successful in modernising the British road system between 1934 and 1937 as Minister of Transport.

As War Secretary from 1937 to 1940, he feuded with the commanding generals and was removed in 1940. Some writers believe that antisemitism played a role in both his dismissal and in blocking his appointment as Minister of Information. One historian compares his strong and weak points:

He was a brilliant speaker, a warm and engaging personality, a go-getter and a persistent driver, a master of the unconventional or indirect approach, a patriot and a man of moral and physical courage, not a great intellect but an original with a flair for imaginative gestures and for public relations. He also had personal weaknesses. He was extremely self-centred and had a fine conceit of himself. At times he was accused of sharp practice. ... Sharp practitioner or not, [his] quickness of mind and tongue, and transparent ambition to be seen to succeed, made him vulnerable to smears. ... His over-assertiveness ... led him to appear inconsiderate of the feelings and views of others.

His name is still widely associated in the UK with the flashing amber "Belisha beacons" that were introduced at pedestrian crossings while he was Minister of Transport.

== Background and education ==
Isaac Leslie Belisha was born into a Jewish family in Hampstead, London, on 7 September 1893. He was the only son of Jacob Isaac Belisha and his wife Elizabeth Miriam (née Miers). His grandfather, Isaac Belisha, was the president of the Manchester Sephardi community; the family originated in Morocco. His father died when he was less than one year old. In 1912 his widowed mother married Adair Hore, Permanent Secretary of the Ministry of Pensions. Belisha then adopted the double-barrelled surname.

Hore-Belisha was educated at Clifton College, where he was in Polack's House. He continued his studies in Paris and Heidelberg, before attending St John's College, Oxford, where he was president of the Oxford Union Society. While in Heidelberg, he became a member of Burschenschaft Frankonia Heidelberg in 1912. During the First World War he joined the British Army and served in France, Flanders and Salonika, finishing the war with the rank of major in the Army Service Corps. After leaving the army, he returned to Oxford and, in 1923, qualified as a barrister.

== Political career ==
At the 1922 general election, Hore-Belisha was an unsuccessful candidate for the Liberal Party in the Plymouth Devonport constituency. However, thanks to his new political agent, Benjamin Musgrave, he won the seat at the general election the following year, and became known in Parliament as a flamboyant and brilliant speaker.

He generally allied himself with right-wing Liberals critical of their party's support for the Labour minority governments, joining with Sir John Simon in becoming a Liberal National upon the formation of the National Government in 1931. After the 1931 general election, Hore-Belisha was appointed a junior minister at the Board of Trade.

He remained in government when the official Liberals withdrew in September 1932 over the issue of free trade, and was promoted to Financial Secretary to the Treasury. Hore-Belisha showed considerable intelligence and drive in government, although his intense energy tended to alienate traditionalist elements who resented his status as an "outsider".

=== Transport minister, 1934–1937 ===
Hore-Belisha was appointed Minister of Transport in 1934 coming to public prominence at a time when motoring was becoming available to the masses. All speed limits for motor cars had controversially been removed by the Road Traffic Act 1930 during the previous administration. There was, in 1934, a record number of road casualties in the UK, with 7,343 deaths and 231,603 injuries being recorded, with half of the casualties being pedestrians and three-quarters occurring in built-up areas.

Shortly after being appointed, he was crossing Camden High Street when a sports car shot along the street without stopping, nearly causing him "serious injury or worse". He became involved in a public-relations exercise to demonstrate how to use the new "uncontrolled crossings".

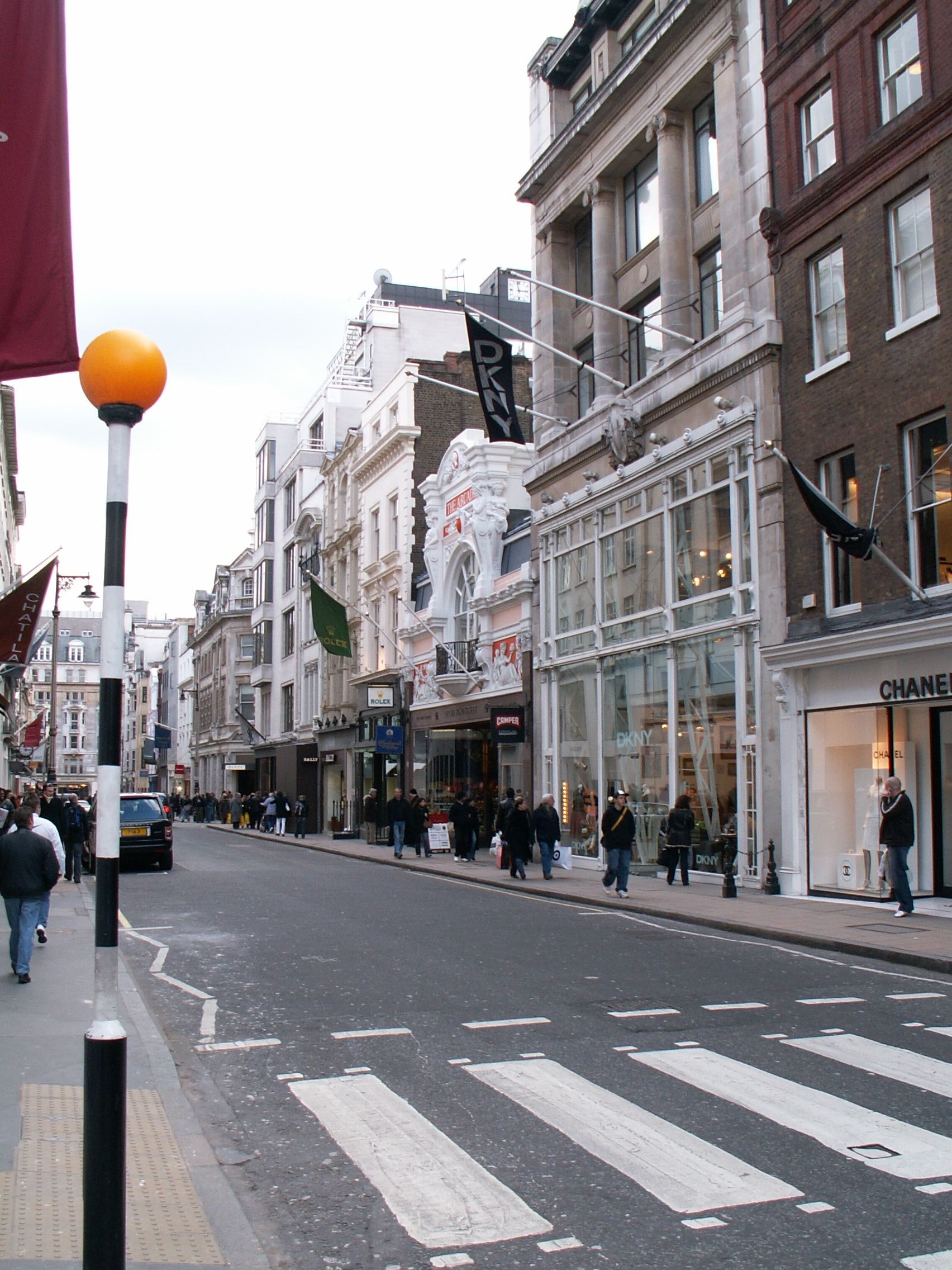
Belisha Beacon, New Bond Street, London

Hore-Belisha's Road Traffic Act 1934 introduced a speed limit of 30 mph for motor cars in built-up areas. The new act was vigorously opposed by many, who saw the new regulations as a removal of "an Englishman's freedom of the highway". The earlier 20 mph speed limit had been abolished in 1930 because it was universally flouted. A large backlog of court cases had made the law unenforceable. In addition, The Automobile Association (AA) and the Royal Automobile Club (RAC) had frequently been successful in defending their members against evidence from primitive speed traps.

Hore-Belisha rewrote the Highway Code and was responsible for the introduction of two innovations that led to a dramatic drop in the number of road accidents: the driving test and the Belisha beacon, named after him by the public. On his retirement, he was made vice-president of the Pedestrians' Association and, the organisation adopted a logo (since replaced) of a walking zebra crossing with Belisha Beacon.

=== Secretary of State for War, 1937–1940 ===
His success at the Ministry of Transport, in 1937, led to an appointment by Neville Chamberlain as Secretary of State for War replacing the popular Alfred Duff Cooper, who later resigned from the government over Chamberlain's policy of appeasement. There were voices within the Conservative majority that such a high-profile appointment should not have gone to a Liberal National, and Hore-Belisha's Conservative colleagues labelled him a warmonger. Many took to nicknaming him "Horeb-Elisha" or "Horeb" as an antisemitic pun on his race. (Horeb is mentioned in the Hebrew Bible as the place where the golden calf was made and to which Elijah fled.)

Upon appointing Hore-Belisha as Secretary of State, Chamberlain advised him to read B. H. Liddell Hart's book Europe in Arms, which advocated that Britain should avoid becoming involved in a continental land war and rely on the Royal Air Force as its offensive arm.

Impressed by the book's arguments and under Cabinet pressure to control expenditure, Hore-Belisha formed a close partnership with Liddell Hart and sought to refocus the British Army away from the aim of raising a second British Expeditionary Force to fight in France.

Unhappy with the Army Council's opposition to his policies, Hore-Belisha sacked Field Marshal Cyril Deverell, the Chief of the Imperial General Staff, along with the Adjutant General and Master-General of the Ordnance in December 1937. Guided by Liddell Hart, he interviewed John Dill and Archibald Wavell before finally settling on Lord Gort, a relatively junior general, as Deverell's replacement. The new team at the head of the British Army was not a success. Gort was no more enthusiastic about Hore-Belisha's course of action than Deverell had been and objected to Liddell Hart's continued influence. For his part by March 1939, Hore-Belisha would declare that "Gort has no brain at all".

The Munich Crisis shook Hore-Belisha's confidence that Britain would be able to avoid full-scale commitment to a continental war. In December 1938, a group of junior Conservative ministers including the Under-Secretary for War, Lord Strathcona, demanded that Chamberlain remove Hore-Belisha. The Prime Minister refused and Strathcona was sacked, but the event demonstrated Hore-Belisha's political isolation. However, in February, he secured a major increase in budget to re-equip the British Army for continental operations. In his speech to Parliament during the March Budget Estimate, Hore-Belisha acknowledged this was a reversal of his previous policy, but still won plaudits for his plans.

Any hope of reconciliation with his military subordinates was ruined when, at a Cabinet meeting on 28 March, Hore-Belisha recommended doubling the size of the Territorial Army to demonstrate Britain's resolve. This was announced in Parliament the next day, to the consternation of the Army Council who had not been consulted about the decision. Lord Gort, who was in France, reputedly learned of it from a newspaper. The Army was already badly short of equipment and raising the new Territorial Divisions would require transferring soldiers from the front line units.

In May, Hore-Belisha succeeded in passing the Military Training Act, the first peacetime conscription law in the United Kingdom. The Act provided for six months of full-time military training, after which men would enter the Reserve. The first cohort began their training in June. Following the outbreak of war in September it was replaced by the National Service Act.

=== Dismissal ===
In January 1940, Prime Minister Chamberlain dismissed Hore-Belisha from the War Office. He had been in an increasingly untenable position due to his disputes with the Army high command and the King and hostility from sympathisers within the public of the British Union of Fascists after Oswald Mosley claimed him to be a "Jewish warmonger". By 1940, his relations with Lord Gort, commander of the British Expeditionary Force (BEF) in France, had deteriorated to the point that neither man had confidence in the other. Gort and other generals disliked Hore-Belisha's showmanship, but their main disagreements had stemmed from the Pillbox affair, concerning the defence of France along the border with Belgium. Hore-Belisha was unpopular amongst his fellow ministers, with meetings of the War Cabinet said to be regularly tense and loud. As a result, Chamberlain agreed to replace him as Secretary of State for War.

Military antisemitism contributed to tensions between Hore-Belisha and Gort. Henry Pownall, the chief of staff to the BEF in France and Belgium until the fall of France in May 1940, claimed in his diary that "the ultimate fact is that they could never get on – you couldn't expect two such utterly different people to do so – a great gentleman and an obscure, shallow-brained, charlatan, political Jewboy".

Initially, the Prime Minister considered Hore-Belisha for the post of Minister of Information, but decided against this when the Foreign Office raised concerns about the effect of having a Jewish politician in this position given the undercurrent of antisemitism in some sections of the public. Instead, Chamberlain offered him the post of Presidency of the Board of Trade. Hore-Belisha refused this demotion and resigned from the government.

Due to the sensitive nature of the disagreements, many MPs and political commentators were bewildered as to why the dismissal had taken place, and Hore-Belisha's formal statement to the Commons left them little wiser. A common belief was that Hore-Belisha's bold reforms at the War Office had been opposed by the established military commanders, often caricatured as Colonel Blimps, and that they had forced his resignation. Colin Brown wrote that Hore-Belisha's dismissal was "possibly fuelled by a desire to placate Hitler [by removing a Jew from the Cabinet] even once war had been declared", or even due to pressure by King George VI upon Chamberlain because of Hore-Belisha's previous support for Edward VIII during the abdication crisis, although the offer of alternative office and Hore-Belisha's original appointment argue against this latter motive. Harry Defries argues that antisemitism was the root cause of the dismissal.

=== Subsequent political career ===
Hore-Belisha attempted to rebuild his career under the wartime premiership of Winston Churchill (1940–1945), but his re-appointment was blocked by a combination of his wounded intransigence and continued Conservative prejudice. He resigned from the Liberal Nationals in 1942, sitting as a "National Independent" MP. In the Conservative "caretaker" government of 1945, he was briefly appointed Minister for National Insurance. At the 1945 general election, Hore-Belisha, still standing as a National Independent, was defeated in Devonport by the Labour candidate, Michael Foot. He, thereupon, peremptorily dismissed Musgrave, his faithful political agent, and joined the Conservative Party. In 1947, he was elected to Westminster City Council. He fought unsuccessfully in the Coventry South constituency at the 1950 general election. In 1954, he was elevated to the peerage as Baron Hore-Belisha, of Devonport in the County of Devon.

== Personal life ==
In 1944, aged 51, he married Cynthia Elliot, who was a relative of the Earl of Minto. They had no children.

While leading a British parliamentary delegation to France in February 1957, he collapsed while making a speech at Hôtel de Ville de Reims, and died a few minutes later.

The cause of death was given as a cerebral haemorrhage. The barony died with him, for he had no children. Lady Hore-Belisha died in July 1991, aged 75.

== Fictional role ==
H. G. Wells in The Shape of Things to Come, published in 1934, predicted a Second World War in which Britain would not participate but would vainly try to effect a peaceful compromise. In this vision, Hore-Belisha was mentioned as one of several prominent Britons delivering "brilliant pacific speeches" which "echo throughout Europe" but fail to end the war. The other would-be peacemakers, in Wells' vision, included Duff Cooper, Ellen Wilkinson and Randolph Churchill.

Parliament of the United Kingdom
Preceded by Sir Clement Kinloch-Cooke	Member of Parliament for Plymouth Devonport; 1923–1945	Succeeded by Michael Foot
Political offices
Preceded by Walter Elliot	Financial Secretary to the Treasury; 1932–1934	Succeeded by Duff Cooper
Preceded by Oliver Stanley	Minister of Transport; 1934–1937	Succeeded by Leslie Burgin
Preceded by Duff Cooper	Secretary of State for War; 1937–1940	Succeeded by Oliver Stanley
Peerage of the United Kingdom
New creation	Baron Hore-Belisha; 1954–1957	Extinct
