= Hamsterley Hall =

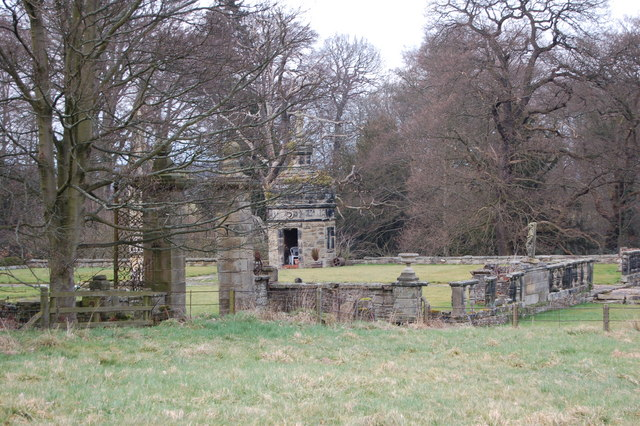
- Gazebo at Hamsterley Hall

- Location in County Durham

General information
- Location: County Durham, England, UK
- Coordinates: 54.895°N 1.779°W
- OS grid: NZ142555

Hamsterley Hall is an 18th-century English country house at Hamsterley, Rowlands Gill, County Durham, England. It is a Grade II* listed building.

The estate at Hamsterley was given, in 1762, by Sir John Swinburne Bt to his younger brother Henry Swinburne. In 1769, Henry carried out substantial alterations to the then existing house to create the present two-story, four-bayed castellated Gothic Revival-style mansion.

Swinburne died in 1803 and in 1806 the property was sold to Anthony Surtees. His son Robert Smith Surtees, a novelist, acquired the estate in 1838. He was High Sheriff of Durham in 1856. He died in 1864, leaving his estate to his daughter Eleanor, who married John Gage Prendergast Vereker, 5th Viscount Gort in 1885. Their first son John Vereker, 6th Viscount Gort VC was succeeded in 1946 by his brother Standish Vereker, 7th Viscount MC who lived at Hamsterley until his death in 1975.

In 2007, the house was purchased by commercial property magnates Bill and Steven Spry for £40 million. At the time of buying, the 47-room hall, noted for its Georgian Gothic architecture, had fallen into disrepair. The Spry family initiated a restoration of the property to make it into their family home. £6.3 million was budgeted for the renewal. The wider estate development included the construction of a 60-home luxury residential development on the surrounding 170-acre estate. The family anticipated moving into the house in 2012.
