= Pillbox affair =

WWII military and political episode in Britain

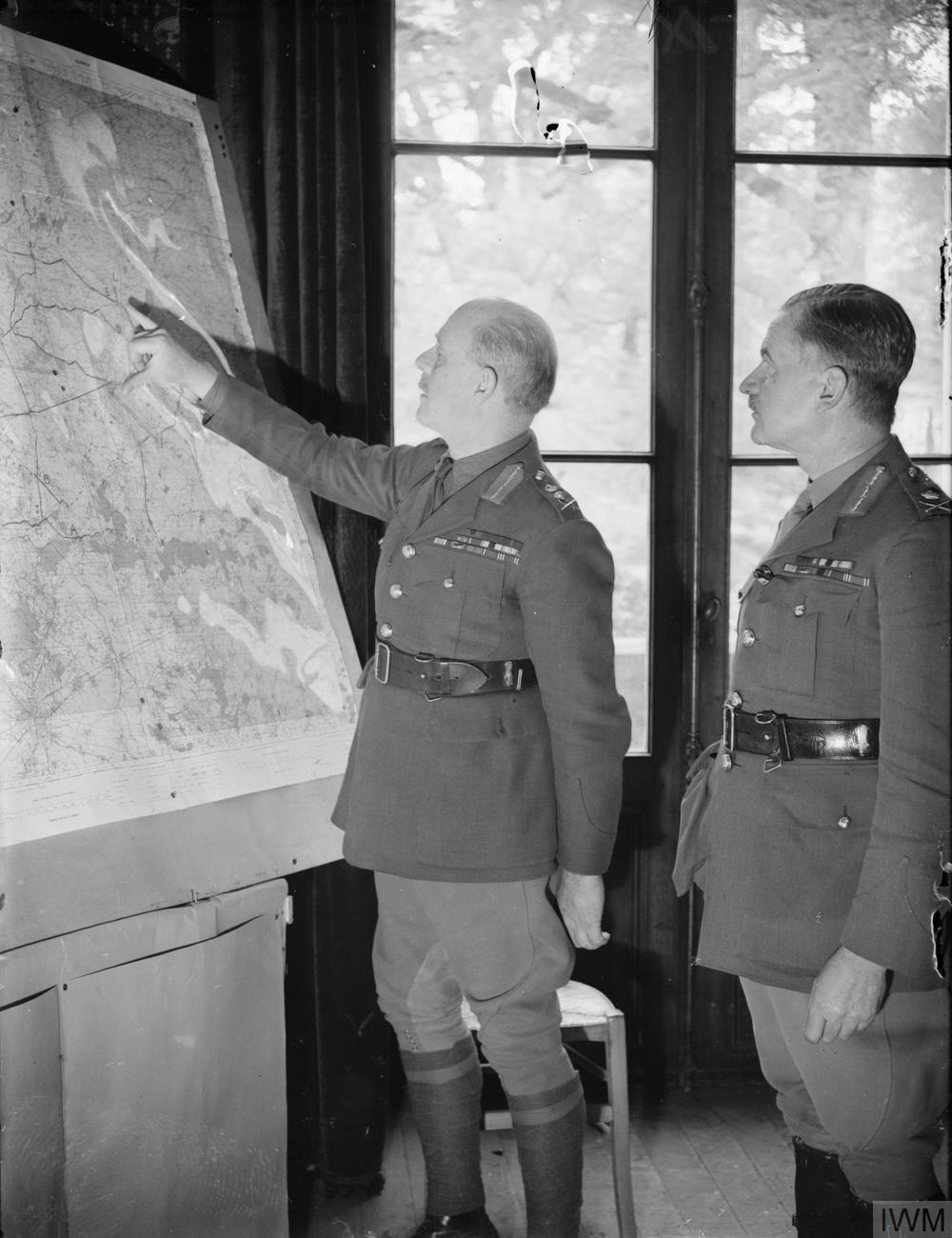
Lord Gort (left) and Lieutenant-General Pownall study a map at GHQ in France, 26 November 1939

The Pillbox affair, also known as the Pillbox incident, was a military and political episode which occurred in Britain between November 1939 and January 1940 during the Second World War which resulted in the January 1940 dismissal of Leslie Hore-Belisha from the post of British War Minister.

Hore-Belisha and the commander of the British Expeditionary Force (BEF), General, later Field Marshal, John Vereker, 6th Viscount Gort, did not get along well together. Gort disliked Hore-Belisha for his colourful personality and unorthodox manner of conducting matters relating to the British Army; the Minister rapidly came to recognise that, and also considered Gort to be "utterly brainless and unable to grasp the simplest problem".

Hore-Belisha visited France and the positions of the BEF in mid-November. During his visit, Hore-Belisha oversaw the placement of the troops of the BEF, not the defences being constructed. On his return to Britain, he complained to the War Cabinet and the Army Council that too few pillbox defences were being built for the BEF.

Gort and colleagues friendly to him were greatly angered by what they saw as this unjust and ill-founded criticism and began a campaign against Hore-Belisha, which culminated in January 1940 in Hore-Belisha's dismissal from the post of War Minister. This campaign succeeded in large part due to antisemitism and class prejudice in the Army and in Parliament.

== Sources ==
- Bond, Brian (1991). "Gort: Field Marshal Lord Gort". In Keegan, John (ed.). Churchill's Generals. Abacus History. ISBN 0-349-11317-3.
- Trythall, A. J. (July 1981). "The Downfall of Leslie Hore-Belisha". Journal of Contemporary History. 16 (3): 391–411. doi:10.1177/002200948101600301. JSTOR 260312. S2CID 159844239.
