= William James Fitzgerald (jurist) =

Irish-born jurist, Chief Justice of Palestine

Sir William James Fitzgerald

Chief Justice of the Supreme Court of Palestine
- In office 1944 – May 1948
- Preceded by: Frederic Gordon Smith

Personal details
- Born: May 1894 Cappawhite, County Tipperary, Ireland, United Kingdom
- Died: July 1989 (aged 95)
- Education: Blackrock College
- Alma mater: Trinity College Dublin
- Occupation: Jurist
- Awards: Military Cross; Croix de Guerre

Military service
- Allegiance: United Kingdom
- Branch/service: British Army
- Unit: Durham Light Infantry
- Battles/wars: World War I

Sir William James Fitzgerald (May 1894 – July 1989) was a British and Irish jurist who served as Chief Justice of the Supreme Court of Palestine during the time of the British Mandate.

== Early life ==
Fitzgerald was born in Cappawhite, County Tipperary, Ireland, in May 1894. He attended Blackrock College and Trinity College Dublin.

During World War I he served in the Durham Light Infantry, being awarded the Military Cross and the Croix de Guerre.

In 1922 he was called to the Bar of Ireland (at the King's Inns, Dublin) and the Bar of England and Wales (at the Middle Temple, London.)

== Colonial service ==
He was appointed Crown Counsel (a public prosecutor) in the colonial government of Nigeria in 1924. In 1932, he was appointed Solicitor-General in Northern Rhodesia (now Zambia); he became the Attorney General there in the following year. In 1937, he was appointed Attorney General of Palestine, at the time under British mandate. In 1944, he was appointed Chief Justice.

In 1945, following Arab claims that the Arab population was underrepresented in the Jerusalem city council, the High Commissioner, Lord Gort, appointed Fitzgerald to investigate the issue and offer a solution. On 28 August Fitzgerald issued his report, which proposed dividing the city into autonomous Jewish and Arab boroughs.

Fitzgerald was the last British Chief Justice of Palestine. Towards the end of the mandate he attempted to find a judicial post in England, but was unsuccessful. He was offered the presidency of the West African Court of Appeal (which was the court of appeal for the British colonies in West Africa) but he rejected the offer.

== Career in the United Kingdom ==
In March 1948, he sent all British judges in Palestine back to the United Kingdom, and in May 1948, following the end of the British mandate, he also returned. Eighteen months later, he was appointed president of the Lands Tribunal in London. This was his last judicial role, which he performed for fifteen years.

== Evaluations ==
The anonymous Irish Times obituarist observed of Sir William's service in Palestine that--

... Sir William is said to have remained "rigidly unpolitical and a man of moderation," whose "evident Irishness was perhaps a help" and who wrote extensively about the importance of Jerusalem's spiritual and cultural legacy. It is said that he was one of the very few "old Palestine hands" who was [sic] equally welcome at the London embassies of Israel and Jordan after the creation of the State of Israel.

Sir William is reported, by the same source, to have favoured the establishment of a Palestinian state.
