= R. S. Surtees =

English writer (1805–1864)

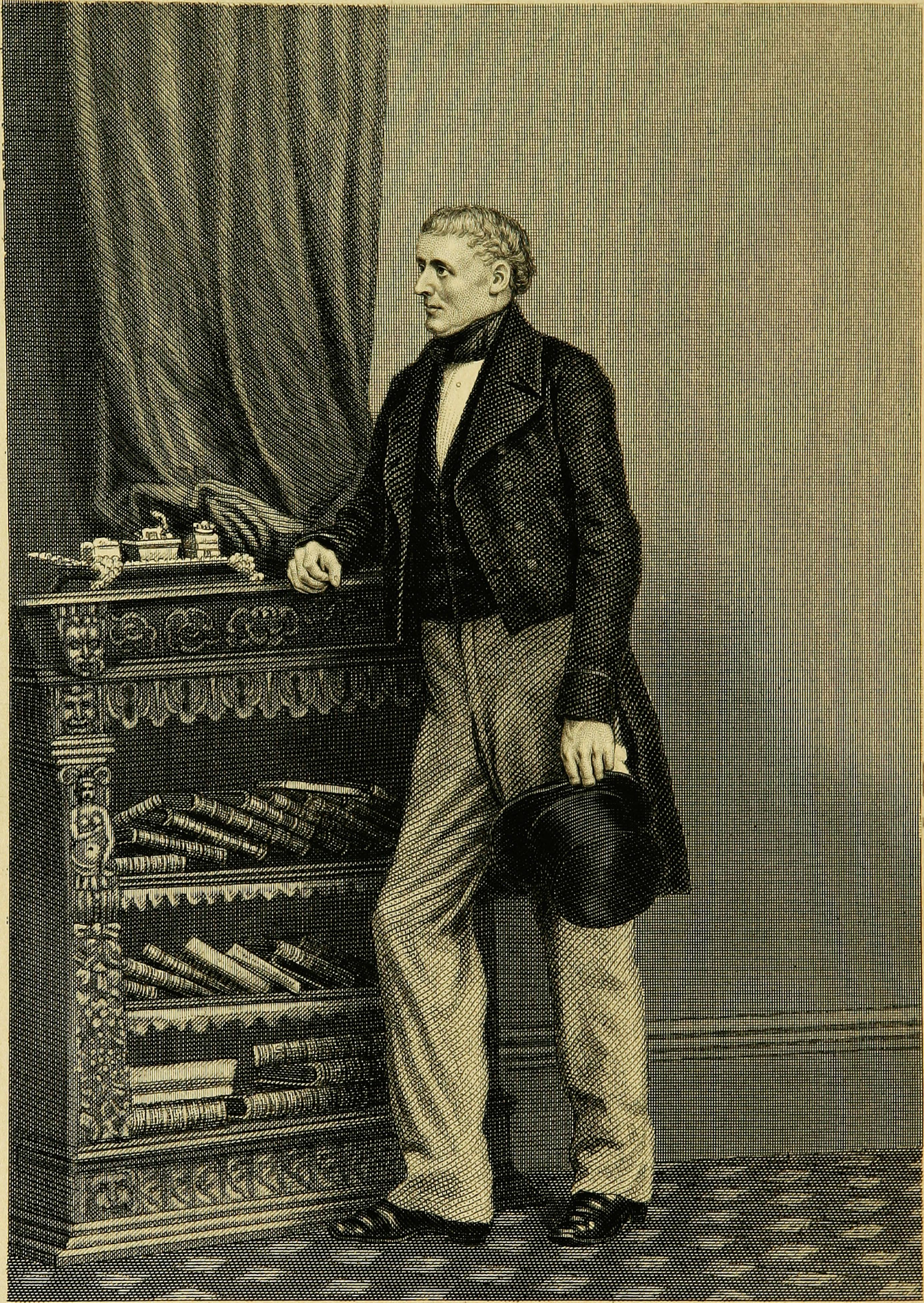
R. S. Surtees (North-country sketches, notes, essays and reviews (1893) by John Bewick.

Robert Smith Surtees (17 May 1805 – 16 March 1864) was an English editor, novelist and sporting writer, widely known as R. S. Surtees. He was the second son of Anthony Surtees of Hamsterley Hall, a member of an old County Durham family. He is remembered for his invented character of Jorrocks, a vulgar but good-natured sporting cockney grocer.

== Early life ==
Surtees attended a school at Ovingham and then Durham School, before being articled in 1822 to Robert Purvis, a solicitor in Newcastle upon Tyne.

== Career ==
Surtees left for London in 1825, intending to practise law in the capital, but had difficulty making his way and began contributing to the Sporting Magazine. He launched out on his own with the New Sporting Magazine in 1831, contributing the comic papers which appeared as Jorrocks' Jaunts and Jollities in 1838. Jorrocks, the sporting cockney grocer, with his vulgarity and good-natured artfulness, was a great success with the public, and Surtees produced more Jorrocks novels in the same vein, notably Handley Cross and Hillingdon Hall, where the description of the house is very reminiscent of Hamsterley. Another hero, Soapey Sponge, appears in Mr Sponge's Sporting Tour, possibly Surtees's best work. All Surtees's novels were composed at Hamsterley Hall, where he wrote standing up at a desk, like Victor Hugo.

In 1835, Surtees abandoned his legal practice and, after inheriting Hamsterley Hall in 1838, devoted himself to hunting and shooting, meanwhile writing anonymously for his own pleasure. He was a friend and admirer of the great hunting man Ralph Lambton, who had his headquarters at Sedgefield, County Durham, the "Melton of the North". Surtees became Lord High Sheriff of Durham in 1856. He died in Brighton in 1864, and was buried in Ebchester church.

Though Surtees did not set his novels in any readily identifiable locality, he uses North East place-names like Sheepwash, Howell (How) Burn, and Winford Rig. His memorable Geordie James Pigg, in Handley Cross, is based on Joe Kirk, a Slaley huntsman. The famous incident, illustrated by Leech, when Pigg jumps into the melon frame was inspired by a similar episode involving Kirk in Corbridge.

As a creator of comic personalities, Surtees is still readable today. William Makepeace Thackeray envied him his powers of observation, while William Morris considered him "a master of life" and ranked him with Charles Dickens. The novels are engaging and vigorous, and abound with sharp social observation, with a keener eye than Dickens for the natural world. Perhaps Surtees most resembles the Dickens of The Pickwick Papers, which was originally intended as mere supporting matter for a series of sporting illustrations to rival Jorrocks.

Most of Surtees's later novels, were illustrated by John Leech. They included Mr Sponge's Sporting Tour (1853), Ask Mamma (1858), Plain or Ringlets? (1860) and Mr Facey Romford's Hounds (1865). The last of these novels appeared posthumously.

In 1841, Surtees married Elizabeth Jane Fenwick (1818–1879), daughter of Addison Fenwick of Bishopwearmouth, by whom he had one son Anthony (1847–1871) and two daughters. His younger daughter Eleanor married John Vereker, afterwards 5th Viscount Gort. Their son was Field Marshal Lord Gort, commander of the BEF in France in 1940.

== Influences on others ==
The character "Stalky" (based on Lionel Dunsterville) from Rudyard Kipling's Stalky & Co. (1899) has Surtees's Handley Cross by heart and quotes from it repeatedly.

The novels of Surtees are mentioned several times in Siegfried Sassoon's 1928 autobiographical novel Memoirs of a Fox-Hunting Man.

Mr. Jorrocks' phrase "my beloved 'earers" often appears in the speech of children in the books of Monica Marsden.

Anthony Blanche, as he prepares Charles Ryder for their dinner outing to Thame in Brideshead Revisited (1945), says that they will "imagine ourselves…where? Not on a j-j-jaunt with J-J-Jorrocks anyway."

"There were Jorrocks' Jaunts and Jollities; there were Soapey Sponge and Mrs. Asquith's Memoirs and Big Game Shooting in Nigeria, all spread open." From Mrs Dalloway by Virginia Woolf.

== Legacy ==
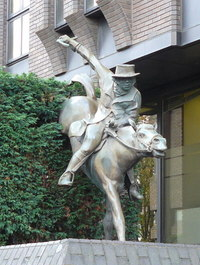
Statue of Jorrocks in George Street, Croydon

Surtees was not among the most popular novelists in the nineteenth century. His work lacked the self-conscious idealism, sentimentality and moralism of the Victorian era; the historian Norman Gash asserted that "His leading male characters were coarse or shady; his leading ladies dashing and far from virtuous; his outlook on society satiric to the point of cynicism." Thomas Seccombe, writing in 1898 for the Dictionary of National Biography, said that it was the illustrations of Leech that gave Surtees' work any notability:

The coarseness of the text was redeemed in 1854 by the brilliantly humorous illustrations of John Leech, who utilised a sketch of a coachman made in church as his model for the ex-grocer. Some of Leech's best work is to be found among his illustrations to Surtees's later novels, notably Ask Mamma and Mr. Romford's Hounds. Without the original illustrations these works have very small interest.

However, for the very reasons that the Victorians deprecated him, Surtees' work has continued to be read long after some of his more popular contemporaries have been forgotten. Gash notes that George Whyte-Melville's hunting novels were far better selling in their day than Surtees's but are now no longer read and appear sanitised in comparison. Gash concludes by writing that:

Surtees's range was limited, his style often clumsy and colloquial. Even in the better-constructed novels the plots are loose and discursive. Nevertheless, his sharp, authentic descriptions of the hunting field have retained their popularity among fox-hunters.... Among a wider public his mordant observations on men, women, and manners; his entertaining array of eccentrics, rakes, and rogues; his skill in the construction of lively dialogue (a matter over which he took great pains); his happy genius for unforgettable and quotable phrases; and above all, his supreme comic masterpiece, Jorrocks, have won him successive generations of devoted followers. Although his proper place among Victorian novelists is not easy to determine, his power as a creative artist was recognized, among professional writers, by Thackeray, Kipling, Arnold Bennett, and Siegfried Sassoon, and earned the tributes of laymen as distinguished and diverse as William Morris, Lord Rosebery, and Theodore Roosevelt.

There is a statue of Jorrocks by John Mills outside 96 George Street, Croydon, London.

A musical based on his works entitled Jorrocks with music and lyrics by David Heneker received a West End run in 1966.

== R. S. Surtees Society ==
The R. S. Surtees Society was founded in 1979 and holds an annual dinner in London. Its stated objectives are:

- To promote the works of R. S. Surtees, to maintain his reputation as an author and to stimulate interest in his literary merits.
- To republish the works of R. S. Surtees as and when the Executive Committee considers necessary and is satisfied that demand exists; and to publish or republish any biographical or appreciative material about R. S. Surtees.
- To arrange such meetings and events as in the opinion of the Committee will achieve the above object; and
- If, in the opinion of the Committee, it is considered advisable to raise funds to achieve the above objects, to publish or republish works by other authors, or prints by artists, or other items of a literary artistic association.

== Major works ==
=== Fiction ===
- Jorrocks' Jaunts and Jollities (1838)
- Handley Cross (1843)
- Hillingdon Hall (1845)
- Hawbuck Grange (1847)
- Mr Sponge's Sporting Tour (1853)
- Ask Mamma (1858)
- Plain or Ringlets ? (1858–1860, in twelve parts)
- Mr Facey Romford's Hounds (1865)
- Young Tom Hall (unfinished)

=== Non-fiction ===
- The Horseman's Manual (1831)
- Analysis of the Hunting Field (1846)
- Hints to Railway Travellers (1852)

=== Bound editions comprising collections of short stories, essays and papers ===
- Town and Country Papers (incorporating "Hints to Railway Travellers")
- Hunting Tours of Surtees
- Mr Jorrocks Thoughts on Hunting and Other Matters
