= Foley Charles Prendergast Vereker =

Royal Navy officer

Foley Charles Prendergast Vereker (21 June 1850 – 24 October 1900) was a Royal Navy Officer and hydrographic surveyor. He is particularly noted as an artist who produced navigational views and illustrations of the places he worked.

== Life ==
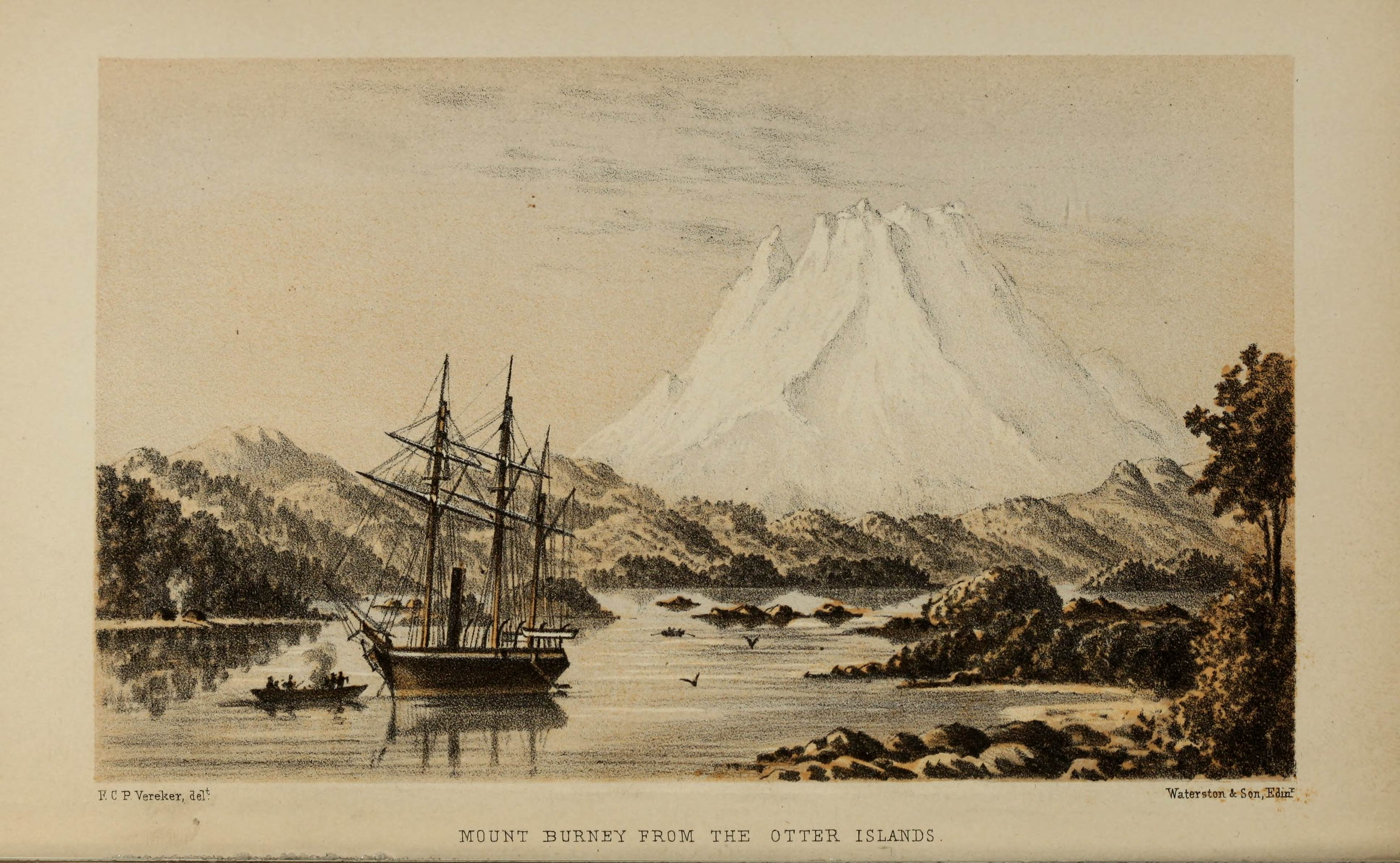
HMS Nassau with Mount Burney in the background. From Cunningham (1871)

Vereker was born at Whitehall, London, the second son of the fourth Viscount Gort, and attended Burney's Academy, a Naval preparatory school in Gosport, Hampshire. He entered the Royal Navy in 1863, and joined the surveying branch in 1868 as a midshipman on HMS Nassau, surveying in the Strait of Magellan. His illustration of Nassau in the Strait was used as the frontispiece of the published account of the natural history of the voyage.

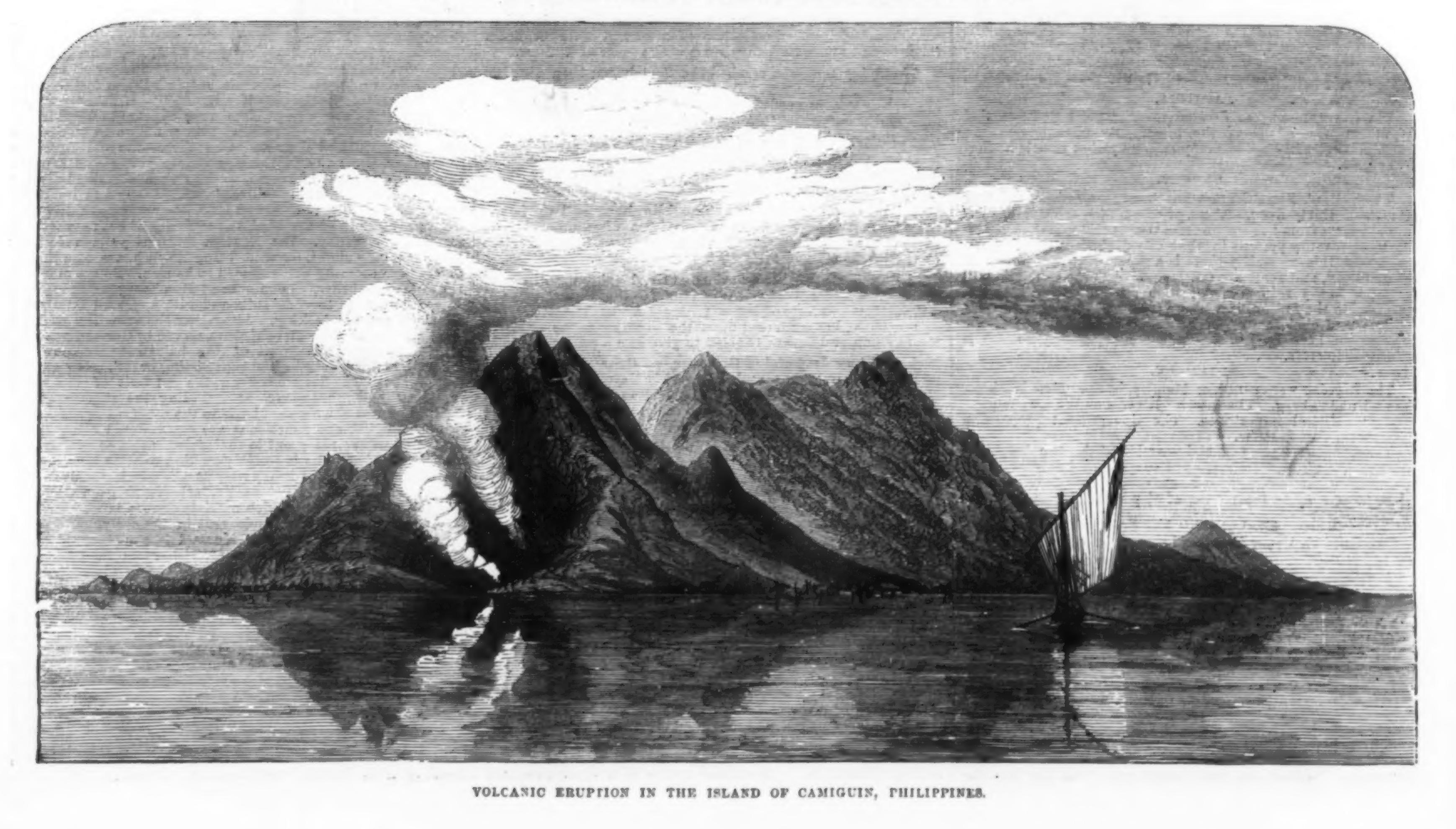
Vereker's illustration of the 1871 Camiguin eruption, from the Illustrated London News

Vereker was promoted to sub-lieutenant in 1870, and moved with Nassau to the China Station, where he worked on the survey of the Sulu Archipelago. In the following year he observed a volcanic eruption on the island of Camiguin in the Philippines, and made an illustration of the event. In 1872 he was in charge of a boat at the destruction of the pirate haunt of Carang-Carang. In 1873 he was promoted to Lieutenant, and was employed surveying on the east coast of Africa, still with Nassau. In 1875 he took part in the bombardment of Mombasa in support of the Sultan of Zanzibar against a rebel chief. In 1876 he married Ellen Amelia Wilshere. He returned to work in the Magellan Strait in HMS Alert, and in 1879 joined the Royal Yacht Victoria and Albert. He was promoted to Commander in 1881.

Vereker returned to surveying in 1883, taking command of his first ship, HMS Magpie for work on the China Station. On 27 August of that year, working off the coast of Borneo, they heard sounds like distant gunfire. The sun, when low, showed a greenish hue. They were later informed of the eruption of Krakatoa a thousand miles away and ordered to the Sunda Strait. In October they entered the Strait, and Vereker published an illustrated account of his observations on the aftermath of the eruption.

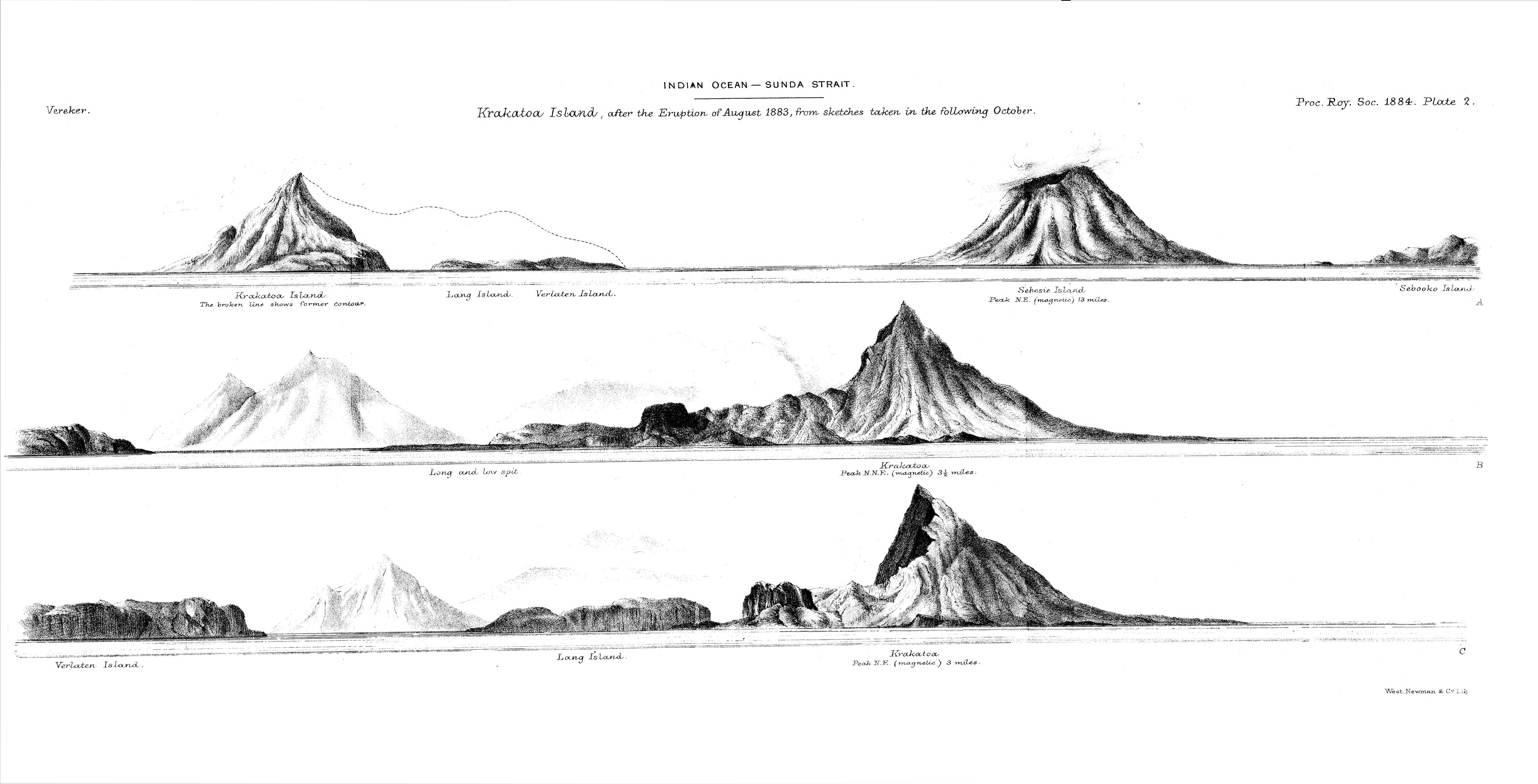

Views of Krakatoa after the eruptions of 1883. From Vereker (1883)

Admiralty Chart of Diego Garcia, surveyed by Vereker in 1885

In 1884, Vereker commissioned HMS Rambler and the following January set off from Plymouth on what Day has described as a "formidabke years's cruise". Work was carried out in Malta, Trinkitat (Port Mornington) on the Red Sea coast of Sudan, Diego Garcia in the Indian Ocean, where a detailed survey was carried out, and Singapore, arriving in Hong Kong in June. A continuous chain of meridian distances was run from Plymouth to Hong Kong. They then surveyed Haitan Island in the Taiwan Strait.

From 1887 to 1889, Vereker was in command of HMS Myrmidon surveying north-west Australia. He was promoted to captain in 1888. He commanded HMS Research in home waters from 1891 to 1895. The surveying work included a re-sounding of the approaches to Portsmouth. He was next employed in preparing sketches of the coasts of Britain and Ireland on HMS Seahorse. In July 1897, Vereker became Adviser to the Harbour Department at the Board of Trade. In 1898 he was elected an associate of the Institution of Civil Engineers. He died in 1900 at his home in Isleworth. He was survived by his wife Ellen.
