= Standish Vereker, 7th Viscount Gort =

Irish peer, connoisseur and collector

Standish Robert Gage Prendergast Vereker, 7th Viscount Gort, MC, KStJ (12 February 1888 – 21 May 1975) was an Anglo-Irish peer, connoisseur and collector of fine art, antiques, and objets d'art, whose seat was at Hamsterley Hall, County Durham. He was appointed High Sheriff of Durham in 1934. He was the brother of John Vereker, 6th Viscount Gort, and inherited that title on the death of Lord Gort without male issue in 1946. He was succeeded in turn by his cousin, Colin Vereker.

== Early life ==
Gort was born in Sausthorpe, Lincolnshire, as the son of Eleanor, Viscountess Gort (née Surtees; 1857–1933) and John Vereker, 5th Viscount Gort (1849–1902). He was educated at Harrow School and Trinity College, Cambridge. After Cambridge, he travelled to Winnipeg, Manitoba in 1911 and established himself as a contractor and later a major real estate holder in the city.

== Military service ==
Gort served in the British Army during the First World War, with the rank of lieutenant. He was wounded three times in the war and earned a Military Cross. Gort married Bessy Surtees, daughter of Aubone Alfred Surtees, on 11 June 1921, in England, and returned briefly to Winnipeg to live with his bride after the war. The couple had no children. By 1923 they had settled in England but he maintained his links with Winnipeg, visiting often over the years to attend to affairs with his numerous real estate holdings, which included the Viscount Gort Hotel on Portage Avenue, and living in the city for extended periods. Gort became a staunch supporter of the arts in Winnipeg.

Gort served under his brother John Vereker, 6th Viscount Gort, in the Second World War. He gained the rank of honorary colonel in 1948 in the service of the 464 Heavy Anti-Aircraft Regiment, Royal Artillery. He was also invested as a Knight of the Most Venerable Order of the Hospital of St John of Jerusalem.

== Collections and Bunratty Castle ==
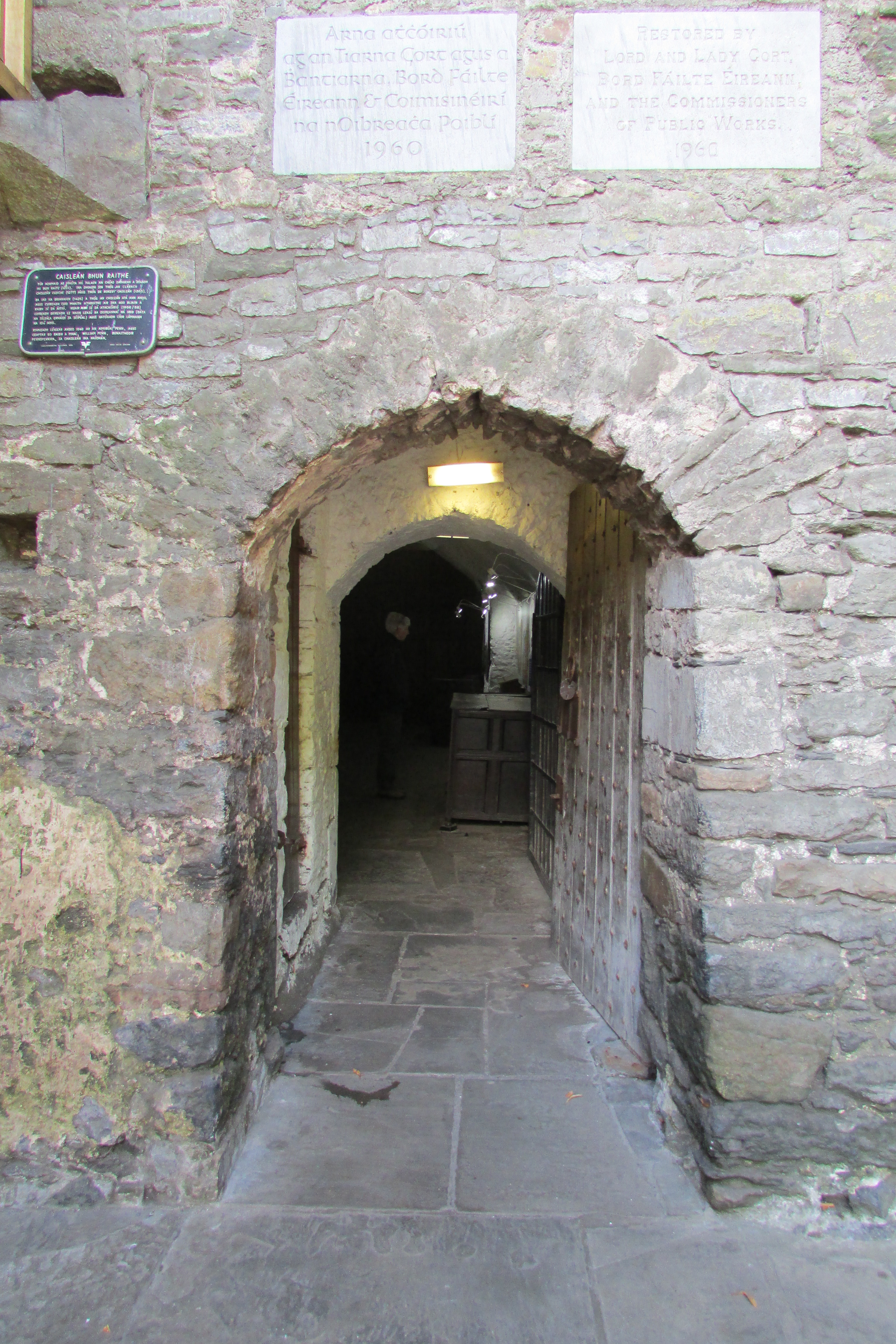
Memorial plaques near the portcullis

Gort bought Bunratty Castle, County Clare, Ireland in 1953. Encouraged by John Hunt he then set about refurbishing the castle with a large personal antique collection. He put a roof on the castle and generally saved it from ruin. It had not been lived in since the building of Bunratty House (now an attraction within the folk park). The castle later was run by Shannon Development.

The castle is today a tourist attraction, with an Irish Victorian-themed folk park which was created around it. It is the most complete and authentically restored and furnished castle in Ireland. The antiques with which Gort filled the castle remain, and visitors to the castle may view them in situ. Gort donated the castle to the public, along with its contents, and the castle and folk park are now run by Shannon Development.

In 1973, two years before his death, Gort and his wife donated a major collection of 18th and 19th-century paintings to the Winnipeg Art Gallery.

Gort is commemorated at the castle by a plaque near the portcullis, and by portraits of him and his wife in the castle. After his death in 1975, he was succeeded in the title by his first cousin, once removed Colin Vereker.

Peerage of Ireland
Preceded by John Vereker	Viscount Gort; 1st creation 1946–1975	Succeeded by Colin Vereker
