= John Vereker (civil servant) =

British civil servant (born 1944)

Sir John Michael Medlicott Vereker, KCB, KStJ, FRSA (born 9 August 1944) is a former British civil servant who served as Permanent Secretary for International Development (1994–2002) and Governor of Bermuda (2002–2007).

== Family and education ==
Sir John Vereker is the younger son of Commander Charles William Medlicott Vereker (1903–1995) and Marjorie Hughes Whatley (d. 1984) and is a descendant of the second Viscount Gort. He was educated at Marlborough College, from which he won a scholarship to the University of Keele, graduating in 1967.

He married in 1971 and has two children with his wife, Judy.

== Career ==
=== HM Civil Service ===
After university, Vereker joined the newly formed Ministry of Overseas Development. He moved to the World Bank, working under Robert McNamara from 1969 to 1972. After returning to the Ministry of Overseas Development, he was appointed private secretary to three Labour Cabinet Ministers – Reg Prentice, Frank Judd and Judith Hart.

In 1980, he was invited by the Prime Minister, Margaret Thatcher, to join her staff in 10 Downing Street, where he served for three years as a member of the small three-person policy unit established by Sir John Hoskyns, working on public sector pay, the labour market and industrial disputes. He helped to establish the feasibility of withstanding a miner's strike, and when the detailed strategy defined by the policy unit was successfully followed, the foundation of the labour market reforms of the 1980s had been laid.

On his return to international development in 1993, Vereker served as Under Secretary for Asia and then as Finance Director. From 1988 to 1993, he was Deputy Secretary of the Department of Education and Science, responsible for higher education and science. He was instrumental in doubling the higher education participation rate from 14% to 28%, transforming the old-style polytechnics into universities, establishing the UK's first student loans scheme and restructuring the UK's Research Councils.

=== Permanent Secretary for International Development (1994–2002) ===
In his time as Permanent Secretary, Sir John led the transformation of the Overseas Development Administration from a self-contained enclave of the Foreign and Commonwealth Office into the fully fledged and highly respected Department for International Development (DFID). He played a leading role in the establishment of the international development targets, which were subsequently adopted as the Millennium Development Goals, and in coordinating the international humanitarian responses to the conflicts in Rwanda, Kosovo and Afghanistan. Shortly before he left DFID, the Prime Minister described it as the best department in Whitehall, and the OECD called it the best development agency in the world.

=== Governor of Bermuda (2002–2007) ===
In 2002 Sir John was appointed Governor and Commander-in-Chief of Bermuda, acting as de facto head of state, with direct responsibility for ensuring the safety, security and good governance of the territory. His initial three-year term was extended at the request of the British Government to nearly six years. He continued to engage with international development issues while in Bermuda. He hosted many key international figures – including the Secretary-General of the United Nations, the President of the World Bank and two British Prime Ministers – at Government House.

He led the discussion on public finance for infrastructure at the Commonwealth Finance Ministers meeting in 2003, was an adviser to the United Nations Millennium Project in 2004, led the discussion of catastrophe insurance at the World Bank/International Monetary Fund annual meeting in 2005 and was a member of Paul Volcker's panel on the World Bank's institutional integrity in 2007.

He was succeeded as Governor of Bermuda by Sir Richard Gozney in December 2007.

=== Later career ===
Sir John joined the main Board of XL Group plc as an independent Director in 2007 and served during the 2008 financial crisis, the acquisition of the Catlin Group in 2015 and the eventual merger with AXA in 2017 – 2018. He was an independent Director of the board of two Axa XL companies, CUAL and XLCICL, from 2017 to 2020. Between 2010 and 2016, Sir John was also an independent Director of MWH Global, a leading US water infrastructure engineering company, from 2010 to 2016, when it was acquired by Stantec.

== Other positions and activities ==
Sir John Vereker has held a variety of positions with several other organisations:

- Ditchley Foundation (Governor)
- Student Loans Company (Chair, 1989–1991)
- Raleigh International (Vice-Chair)
- British Council (board member)
- Institute of Development Studies (board member)
- Institute for Employment Studies (board member)
- Voluntary Service Overseas (board member)
- Centre for Global Ethics (board member)
- British Consultancy and Construction Bureau (board member)
- Institute of Management (Companion)
- International Association for Digital Publications (Trustee, 2004–2008)

He is the author of Blazing the Trail: Eight Years of Change in Handling International Development (2008), The search for the silver bullet: a personal perspective on 50 years of the international development effort (2020) and 'Adieu DFID – or is it Au Revoir' (2020).

== Recognition ==
Vereker became a Companion of the Order of the Bath (CB) in 1992 and was knighted (KCB) in 1999. He holds an honorary doctorate from the University of Keele and is a Fellow of the Royal Society of Arts.
