= John Vereker, 6th Viscount Gort =

British Army officer (1886–1946)

Field Marshal The Right Honourable The Viscount Gort VC GCB CBE DSO & Two Bars MVO MC
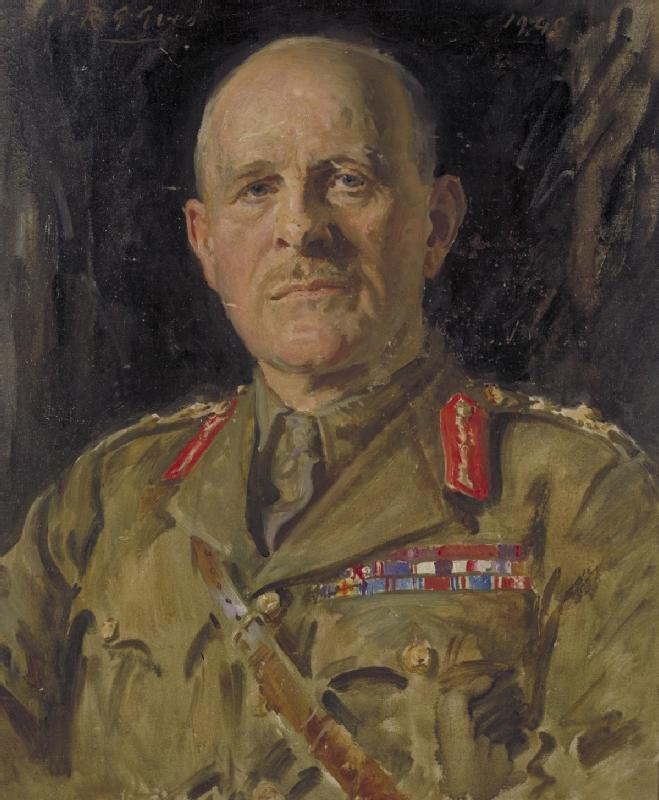

High Commissioner for Palestine and Transjordan
- In office 1 November 1944 – 5 November 1945
- Monarch: George VI
- Preceded by: Sir Harold MacMichael
- Succeeded by: Sir Alan Cunningham

Governor of Malta
- In office 7 May 1942 – 26 September 1944
- Monarch: George VI
- Preceded by: Sir William Dobbie
- Succeeded by: Sir Edmond Schreiber

Governor of Gibraltar
- In office 14 May 1941 – 31 May 1942
- Monarch: George VI
- Preceded by: Sir Clive Liddell
- Succeeded by: Sir Noel Mason-Macfarlane

Personal details
- Born: John Standish Surtees Prendergast Vereker; 10 July 1886 Westminster, London, England
- Died: 31 March 1946 (aged 59) Southwark, London, England
- Spouse: Corinna Vereker (m. 1911; div. 1925)
- Children: 3
- Parent(s): The 5th Viscount Gort; Eleanor Surtees
- Relatives: The 1st Viscount De L'Isle (son-in-law)
- Nickname: "Tiger"

Military service
- Allegiance: United Kingdom
- Branch/service: British Army
- Years of service: 1905–1945
- Rank: Field marshal
- Commands: British Expeditionary Force; Chief of the Imperial General Staff; Staff College, Camberley; Guards Brigade; 1st Battalion, Grenadier Guards; 4th Battalion, Grenadier Guards
- Battles/wars: First World War; Second World War
- Awards: Victoria Cross; Knight Grand Cross of the Order of the Bath; Commander of the Order of the British Empire; Companion of the Distinguished Service Order & Two Bars; Member of the Royal Victorian Order; Military Cross; Mentioned in Despatches (9)

Field Marshal John Standish Surtees Prendergast Vereker, 6th Viscount Gort (10 July 1886 – 31 March 1946), was a senior British Army officer. As a young officer during the First World War, he was decorated with the Victoria Cross for his actions during the Battle of the Canal du Nord. During the 1930s he served as Chief of the Imperial General Staff (the professional head of the British Army). He is best known for commanding the British Expeditionary Force that was sent to France in the first year of the Second World War, only to be evacuated from Dunkirk the following year. Gort later served as Governor of Gibraltar and Malta, and High Commissioner for Palestine and Transjordan.

== Early life ==
Vereker was born in London. His mother was Eleanor, Viscountess Gort (née Surtees; 1857–1933; later Eleanor Benson), who was a daughter of the writer Robert Smith Surtees. Vereker's father was John Vereker, 5th Viscount Gort (1849–1902).

Vereker grew up in County Durham and the Isle of Wight. He was educated at Malvern Link Preparatory School, Harrow School, and entered the Royal Military College, Sandhurst, in January 1904. As Viscount Gort, he was commissioned as a second lieutenant in the Grenadier Guards on 16 August 1905, and promoted to lieutenant on 1 April 1907.

In November 1908, Gort visited his uncle, Jeffrey Edward Prendergast Vereker, a retired British army major, who was living in Canada, at Kenora, Ontario. During a moose hunting trip, Gort slipped off a large boulder, causing his rifle to discharge; the bullet injured a local guide, William Prettie, who later died of his wound in Winnipeg. Gort returned immediately to England. While studying at Trinity College, Cambridge, he was initiated into Isaac Newton University Lodge.

Gort commanded the detachment of Grenadier Guards that bore the coffin at the funeral of King Edward VII in May 1910. He was appointed a Member of the Royal Victorian Order in June 1910.

== First World War ==
On 5 August 1914, Gort was promoted to captain. He went to France with the British Expeditionary Force (BEF) and fought on the Western Front, taking part in the retreat from Mons in August 1914. He became a staff officer with the First Army in December 1914 and then very briefly served as a general staff officer, grade 3 (GSO3) in February 1915 before he became brigade major of the 4th (Guards) Brigade, commanded then by Brigadier General The Earl of Cavan, a future field marshal, in April 1915. He was awarded the Military Cross in June 1915. Promoted to the brevet rank of major in June 1916, he became a staff officer at the headquarters of the BEF and fought at the Battle of the Somme throughout the autumn of 1916. He was given the acting rank of lieutenant colonel in April 1917 on appointment as Commanding Officer of 4th Battalion, Grenadier Guards and, having been appointed a Companion of the Distinguished Service Order (DSO) in June 1917, he led his battalion at the Battle of Passchendaele, earning a Bar to his DSO in September 1917. The bar's citation reads:

For conspicuous gallantry and devotion to duty. Although hit in two places in the shoulder by the bursting of a shell early in the day and in great pain, he refused to leave his battalion, and personally superintended the consolidation subsequent to a successful attack. He remained with them until 5 p.m. on the following day, when he was ordered to come out and have his wounds dressed. His conduct set a very fine example of self-sacrifice, and was of great value in maintaining the high morale and offensive spirit of his battalion.

On 27 November 1918, sixteen days after the war came to an end, Gort was awarded the Victoria Cross, the highest award for gallantry in the face of the enemy that can be awarded to British and Commonwealth forces, for his actions on 27 September 1918 at the Battle of the Canal du Nord, near Flesquieres, France.

Victoria Cross citation

Captain (Brevet Major, Acting Lieutenant-Colonel), 1st Battalion The Grenadier Guards

Citation: For most conspicuous bravery, skilful leading and devotion to duty during the attack of the Guards Division on 27th September 1918, across the Canal du Nord, near Flesquieres, when in command of the 1st Battalion, Grenadier Guards, the leading battalion of the 3rd Guards Brigade. Under heavy artillery and machine-gun fire he led his battalion with great skill and determination to the "forming-up" ground, where very severe fire from artillery and machine guns was again encountered. Although wounded, he quickly grasped the situation, directed a platoon to proceed down a sunken road to make a flanking attack, and, under terrific fire, went across open ground to obtain the assistance of a Tank, which he personally led and directed to the best possible advantage. While thus fearlessly exposing himself, he was again severely wounded by a shell. Notwithstanding considerable loss of blood, after lying on a stretcher for a while, he insisted on getting up and personally directing the further attack. By his magnificent example of devotion to duty and utter disregard of personal safety all ranks were inspired to exert themselves to the utmost, and the attack resulted in the capture of over 200 prisoners, two batteries of field guns and numerous machine guns. Lt.-Col. Viscount Gort then proceeded to organise the defence of the captured position until he collapsed; even then he refused to leave the field until he had seen the "success signal" go up on the final objective.

The successful advance of the battalion was mainly due to the valour, devotion and leadership of this very gallant officer.

Subsequent to this he became known as "Tiger" Gort. He won a second Bar to his DSO in January 1919, with the citation reading:

For conspicuous gallantry and devotion to duty in command of his battalion. He led his men up by night to relieve a battalion which had attacked and failed to reach its objective. Regardless of danger he personally reconnoitred the line ahead of his troops, and got them on to the objective before dawn. During the three following days he again made forward reconnaissances, and leading his battalion gradually on, advanced the line 800 yards and gained a canal bank. It is impossible to speak too highly of this officer's initiative.

He was also mentioned in despatches eight times during the war.

== Inter-war years ==
Gort was promoted to the substantive rank of major on 21 October 1919. He studied at the Staff College, Camberley, was posted Headquarters London District in 1919 and, having been promoted to brevet lieutenant-colonel on 1 January 1921, he was posted back to the College as an instructor. He left the Staff College in May 1923.

Promoted to colonel in April 1926 (with seniority backdated to 1 January 1925), he became a staff officer at London District in 1926 and then became a chief instructor at the Senior Officers' School at Sheerness. After being posted to the Shanghai International Settlement in January 1927, he gave a report of his findings to the King and the Prince of Wales. He returned home to be a staff officer at Headquarters 4th Infantry Division at Colchester in July 1927.

In the 1928 Birthday Honours, Gort was appointed a Commander of the Order of the British Empire. He was appointed commander of the Grenadier Guards and Regimental District in January 1930, and, after being placed on half-pay in July 1932, officer in command of military training in India with the temporary rank of brigadier in 1932.

After acquiring a de Havilland Moth aircraft named Henrietta in 1930, Gort became chairman of the Household Brigade Flying Club. On 25 November 1935, he was promoted, at the relatively young age (in peacetime, where promotion was painfully slow) of 49, to major-general. He returned to the Staff College in 1936 as its Commandant.

In May 1937, Gort was appointed a Companion of the Order of the Bath. In September 1937, he became Military Secretary to the Secretary of State for War, Leslie Hore-Belisha, with the temporary rank of lieutenant-general. On 6 December 1937, as part of a purge by Hore-Belisha of senior officers, Gort was appointed to the Army Council, made a general and replaced Field Marshal Sir Cyril Deverell as Chief of the Imperial General Staff (CIGS). On 1 January 1938, he was made a Knight Commander of the Order of the Bath. His appointment was generally well received in the army, although there was some resentment in his having passed over a number of much older and more senior officers, among them John Dill, Archibald Wavell and Alan Brooke, who would later become an outspoken critic of Gort. He was not especially highly regarded for his intelligence and so Major General Ronald Adam was appointed to be Gort's Deputy Chief of the Imperial General Staff.

On 2 December 1938 Gort submitted a report on the readiness of the British Army. He observed that Nazi Germany, as a result of the acquisition of Czechoslovakia, was in a stronger position than the previous year and that as a result of the government's decision in 1937 to create a "general purpose" army, Britain lacked the necessary forces for the defence of France.

On 21 December Gort recommended to the Chiefs of Staff that Britain would need to help France defend the Netherlands and Belgium, and that for that purpose the British Army needed complete equipment for four Regular army infantry divisions and two mobile armoured divisions, with the Territorial army armed with training equipment and then war equipment for four divisions. In response, the First Sea Lord, Admiral Sir Roger Backhouse, noted that such a commitment would be substantial. Gort also attacked as a fallacy the theory of strategic mobility by the use of seapower because in modern war land transport was faster and cheaper than transport by sea. The experience of David Lloyd George's 1917 Alexandretta project "proved that [maritime side-shows] invariably led to vast commitments out of all proportion to the value of the object attained". If a purely defensive position was taken the Maginot Line would be broken, and the British Army (with anti-aircraft defence) was only getting £277 million out of a total £2,000 million spent on defence.

== Second World War ==
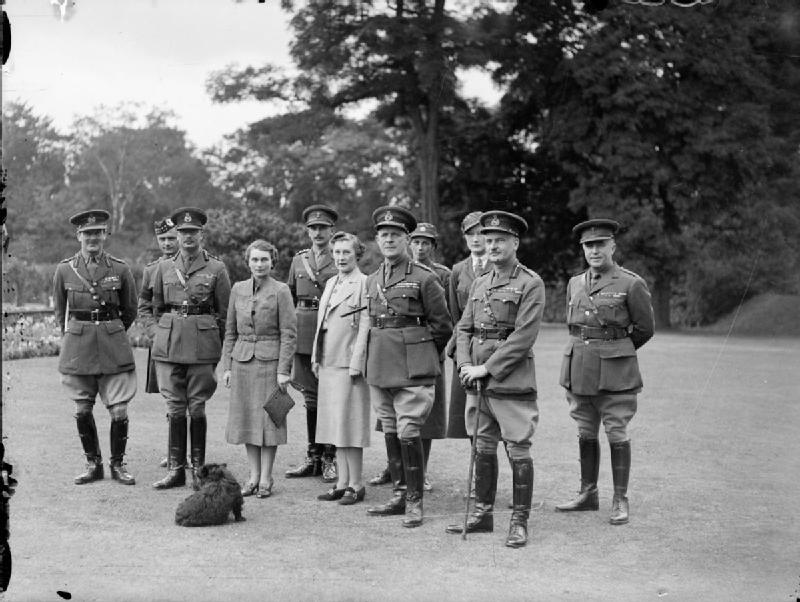
The Duke and Duchess of Gloucester, Lord Gort and Lady Gort, with staff officers at the Staff College, Camberley, prior to the departure of Lord Gort and his staff to France, November 1939

On the outbreak of the Second World War, Gort was appointed by Prime Minister Neville Chamberlain as the Commander-in-Chief of the British Expeditionary Force (BEF) in France, arriving there on 19 September 1939.

Unimpressed by Gort's qualities for command, War Minister Leslie Hore-Belisha described Gort as "utterly brainless and unable to grasp the simplest problem". Gort dismissed his subordinates' critiques of the Allies' Plan D, including his former friend Alan Brooke's correct prediction that it would allow the Wehrmacht to outflank the Allied forces, as defeatist. The Pillbox affair, as it was known, resulted in Hore-Belisha's dismissal.

On 25 May 1940, facing overwhelming German forces, Gort decided that he could no longer support the French Army and ordered a retreat by the BEF northwards to the French coast. On reaching the coast Gort oversaw the en masse retirement of the BEF back to the British Isles, involving the Battle of Dunkirk and the Dunkirk evacuation, while France was defeated and surrendered to Nazi Germany four weeks later.

Some historians have argued that, by these actions, Gort saved the BEF, while others believe that he should have continued to attack the German forces.

The chaotic rout of the BEF under Gort's command from France convinced Winston Churchill, the newly installed British Prime Minister, that he was undesirable as a field commander, and he was side-lined to non-combatant posts. On his return from France on 1 June 1940 he was appointed an ADC General to George VI. He accompanied Duff Cooper to Rabat in Morocco, to rally anti-Nazi French cabinet ministers, but was instead temporarily held on his flying boat.

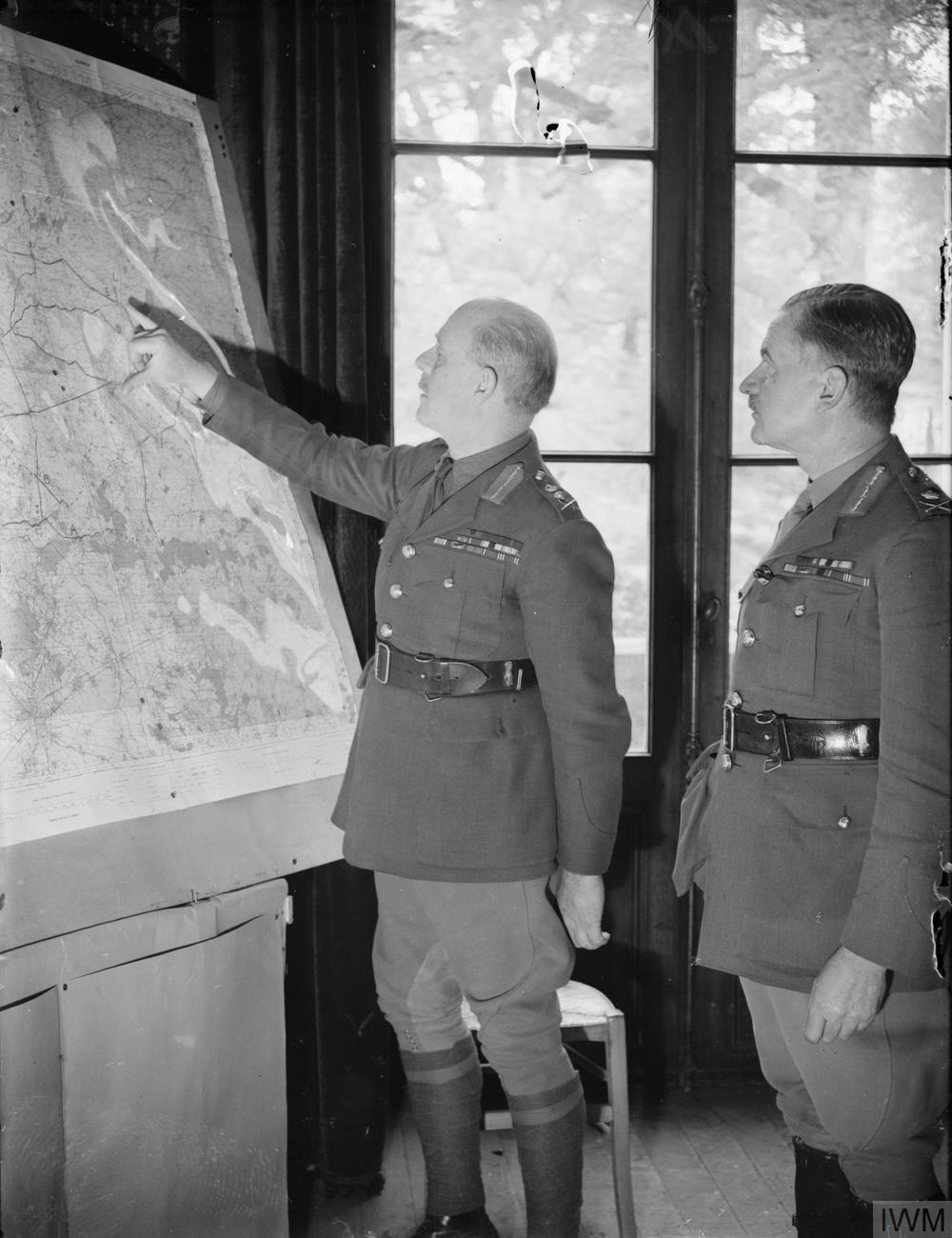
Lord Gort and Lieutenant-General Henry Pownall study a map at GHQ in the château at Habarcq, 26 November 1939.

Gort was appointed Inspector of Training and General Officer Commanding the Home Guard in late 1940. He went on trips to Iceland, Orkney and Shetland. He was then appointed Governor of Gibraltar in 1941. In 1943, he succeeded George Monckton-Arundell, 8th Viscount Galway as Colonel Commandant of the Honourable Artillery Company, a position he held until his death.

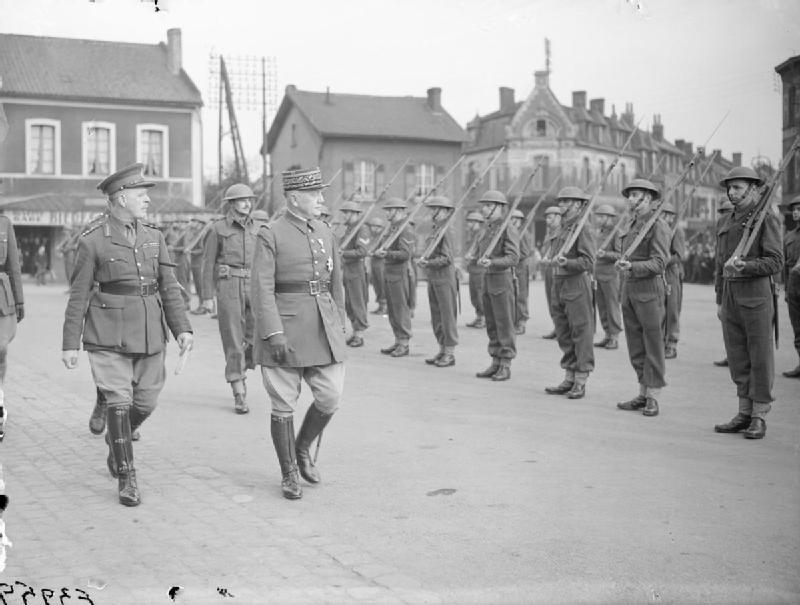
General Alphonse Joseph Georges of the French Army, accompanied by General Lord Gort, Commander-in-Chief (C-in-C) of the BEF, inspecting men of the 2nd Battalion, Royal Inniskilling Fusiliers, 5th Division, at Bethune, France, 23 April 1940

Gort was appointed Governor of Malta in 1942 and led the defence of the island under siege from enemy forces. The Maltese Government presented a Sword of Honour to him for this role.

During November 1942 in Malta, when Carmelo Borg Pisani was sentenced to death for espionage and for taking up arms against the UK Government, Gort received a petition by Borg Pisani's brother, whereby he beseeched him to use the prerogative of mercy and to reverse the sentence to long-term or life imprisonment instead of execution. Gort denied the petition for clemency with a note stating that the he saw "no reason to interfere with the course of the law".

Gort received his field marshal's baton from the King at Malta on 20 June 1943. Gort was in attendance, along with Generals Dwight D. Eisenhower and Harold Alexander, when Marshal Pietro Badoglio signed the surrender of all Italian forces in Valletta harbour on 29 September 1943.

Gort was also present when his son-in-law, Major William Sidney, received the Victoria Cross from General Sir Harold Alexander, Commander-in-Chief (C-in-C) of the Allied Armies in Italy, on 3 March 1944 in Italy.

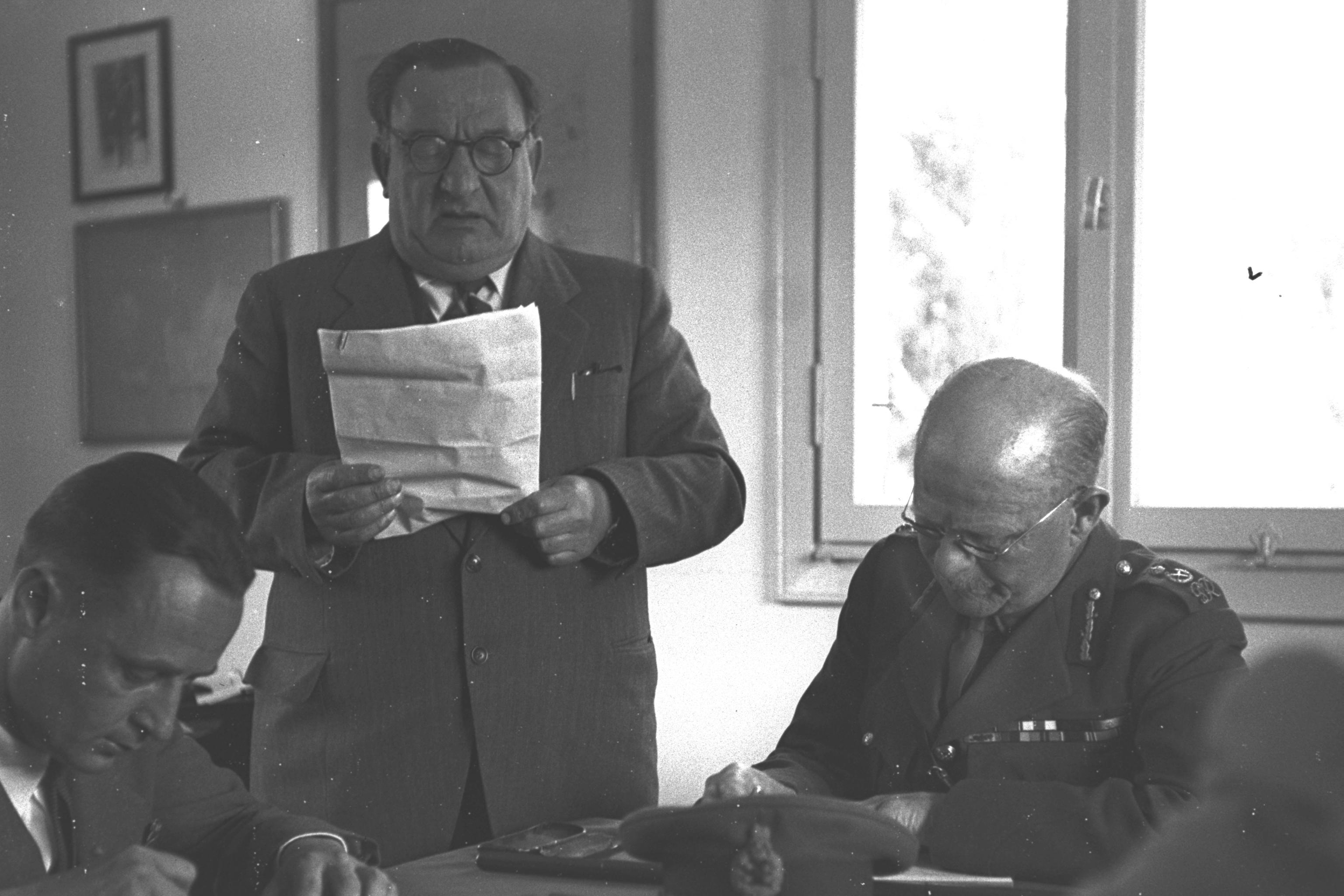
Lord Gort with Avraham Krinitzi, mayor of Ramat Gan, April 1945

Gort was appointed High Commissioner for Palestine and Transjordan in late 1944. He served in this office for only one year. In 1945 he nominated William James Fitzgerald, Chief Justice of Palestine, to enquire into the Jewish-Arab conflict in Jerusalem. Chief Justice Fitzgerald issued his report in which he proposed to divide the city into separate Jewish and Arab Quarters. Despite growing tensions in Palestine, Gort strove to cultivate good personal relations with both Jews and Arabs, and was greatly admired and respected by the Jewish and Arab communities.

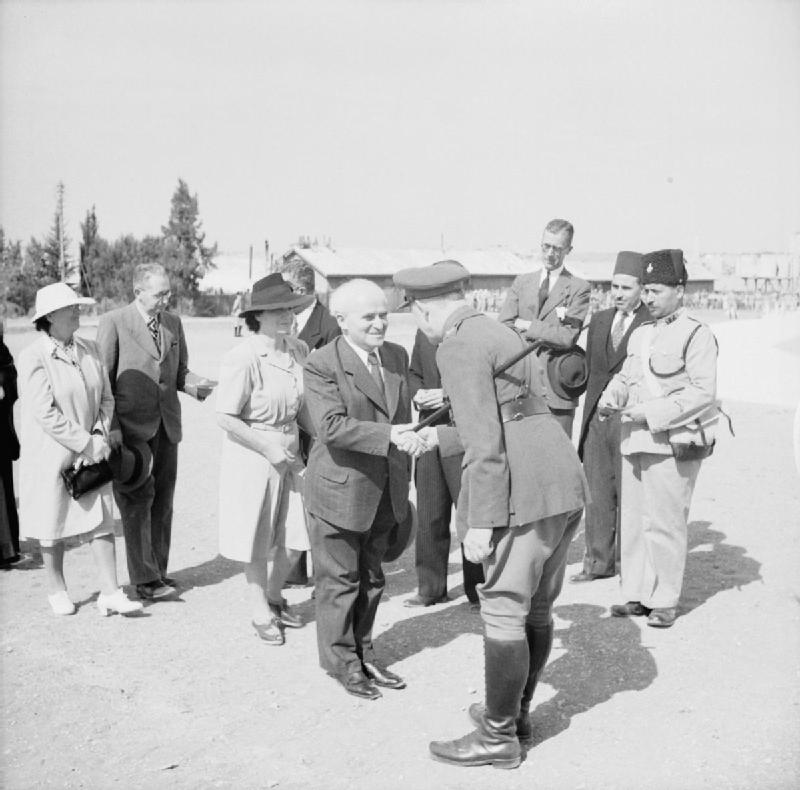
Mr and Mrs David Ben-Gurion of the Jewish Agency being presented to Viscount Gort, the new Commissioner of Palestine.

During his time in Palestine, Gort's health deteriorated, and he was suffering from great pain and discomfort in his abdomen. He was in fact suffering from liver cancer, but the doctors he consulted in London were unable to properly diagnose his condition. Gort ruled Palestine at the time that the Jewish insurgency was beginning. Despite his efforts, he was unable to stem the growing confrontation between the Yishuv (Jewish community) and British authorities. On 5 November 1945, he stepped down as High Commissioner and returned to Britain. Commenting on his departure, The Palestine Post wrote that "No High Commissioner in the twenty-five years of British rule in Palestine enjoyed greater popular trust and none repaid it with greater personal kindness."

== Death ==
After leaving Palestine and returning to England, Gort was admitted to Guy's Hospital in London, where exploratory surgery revealed that he was dying from inoperable liver cancer. Already a viscount in the Peerage of Ireland, Gort was created a viscount in the Peerage of the United Kingdom in February 1946. On 31 March 1946, he died in Guy's Hospital at the age of 59 years. As he did not have a surviving son, the Irish viscountcy passed to his brother, Standish Vereker, and the British creation became extinct. His body was entombed in the Sidney family vault at St John the Baptist, Penshurst, in the county of Kent.

== Family ==
Gort married Corinna Katherine Vereker, his second cousin, on 22 February 1911; the couple had two sons and a daughter, before divorcing (1925). Their elder son, Charles Standish Vereker, was born on 23 February 1912, and served as a lieutenant with the Grenadier Guards, before committing suicide (26 February 1941). A second son, Jocelyn Cecil Vereker, was born on 27 July 1913, but died before his second birthday. Gort's daughter, Jacqueline Corinne Yvonne Vereker, who was born on 20 October 1914, married (June 1940) William Sidney, later the 1st Viscount De L'Isle.

== Portrayals ==
- Cyril Raymond (1958) Dunkirk
- John Carlisle (2004) Dunkirk

== Arms ==
Coat of arms of John Vereker, 6th Viscount Gort
Crest Out of a mural crown gules a stag's head proper. Escutcheon Quarterly, 1st and 4th, azure on a chevron or a chaplet vert, for Vereker; 2nd and 3rd, gules a saltire vairy or and azure, for Prendergast. Supporters Dexter, a lion proper; sinister, an heraldic antelope proper; each gorged with a plain gules, rimmed and chained or, chain reflexed over the back. Motto Vincit Veritas & Coloony Orders Victoria Cross, Knight Grand Cross of the Order of the Bath (Military Division), Commander of the Order of the British Empire (Military Division), Companion of the Distinguished Service Order & Two Bars, and Member of the Royal Victorian Order.

== Bibliography ==
- Barnett, Corelli (2002). The Collapse of British Power. Pan. ISBN 978-0330491815.
- Ellis, Major L. F. (1954). The War in France and Flanders 1939–1940. History of the Second World War: United Kingdom Military. HMSO.
- Falls, Cyrl (2009). "Vereker, John Standish Surtees Prendergast, sixth Viscount Gort in the peerage of Ireland and first Viscount Gort in the peerage of the United Kingdom (1886–1946)". Oxford Dictionary of National Biography (online ed.). Oxford University Press. doi:10.1093/ref:odnb/36642. (Subscription, Wikipedia Library access or UK public library membership required.)
- Gardner, W. J. R., ed. (2000) [First published 1949]. The Evacuation of Dunkirk: Operation Dynamo. Routledge. ISBN 978-0-7146-5120-0.
- Garland, Albert (1986). United States Army in World War 2, Mediterranean Theater of Operations, Sicily and the Surrender of Italy. United States Government Printing. ISBN 978-9990858822.
- Heathcote, Tony (1999). The British Field Marshals 1736–1997. Pen & Sword Books. ISBN 0-85052-696-5.
- Hesilrige, Arthur G. M. (1921). Debrett's Peerage and Titles of courtesy. London, UK: Dean & Son. p. 409.
- Johnson, Brigadier R. F. (1958). Regimental Fire, A History of the HAC in World War II 1939–1945.
- Mead, Richard (2007). Churchill's Lions: A Biographical Guide to the Key British Generals of World War II. Stroud: Spellmount. ISBN 978-1-86227-431-0.
- Moure, Kenneth; Alexander, Martin S. (2001). Crisis and Renewal in Twentieth Century France. Berghahn Books. ISBN 978-1-57181-297-1.
- Smart, Nick (2005). Biographical Dictionary of British Generals of the Second World War. Barnesley: Pen & Sword. ISBN 1844150496.

Military offices
Preceded by Clement Armitage	Commandant of the Staff College, Camberley; 1936–1937	Succeeded by Ronald Adam
Preceded by Sir Charles Deedes	Military Secretary; September–December 1937	Succeeded by Sir Douglas Brownrigg
Preceded by Sir Cyril Deverell	Chief of the Imperial General Staff; 1937–1939	Succeeded by Sir Edmund Ironside
Preceded by The Earl Fortescue	Colonel Commandant and President, Honourable Artillery Company; 1943–1946	Succeeded by Alan Brooke, 1st Viscount Alanbrooke
Government offices
Preceded by Sir Clive Liddell	Governor of Gibraltar; 1941–1942	Succeeded by Sir Noel Mason-Macfarlane
Preceded by Sir William Dobbie	Governor of Malta; 1942–1944	Succeeded by Sir Edmond Schreiber
Preceded by Sir Harold MacMichael	High Commissioner for Palestine and High Commissioner for Trans-Jordan; 1944–1945	Succeeded by Sir Alan G. Cunningham
Peerage of Ireland
Preceded by John Vereker	Viscount Gort; 1st creation 1902–1946	Succeeded by Standish Vereker
