= List of mayors of Limerick =

This page is a list of mayors of the city of Limerick, Ireland.

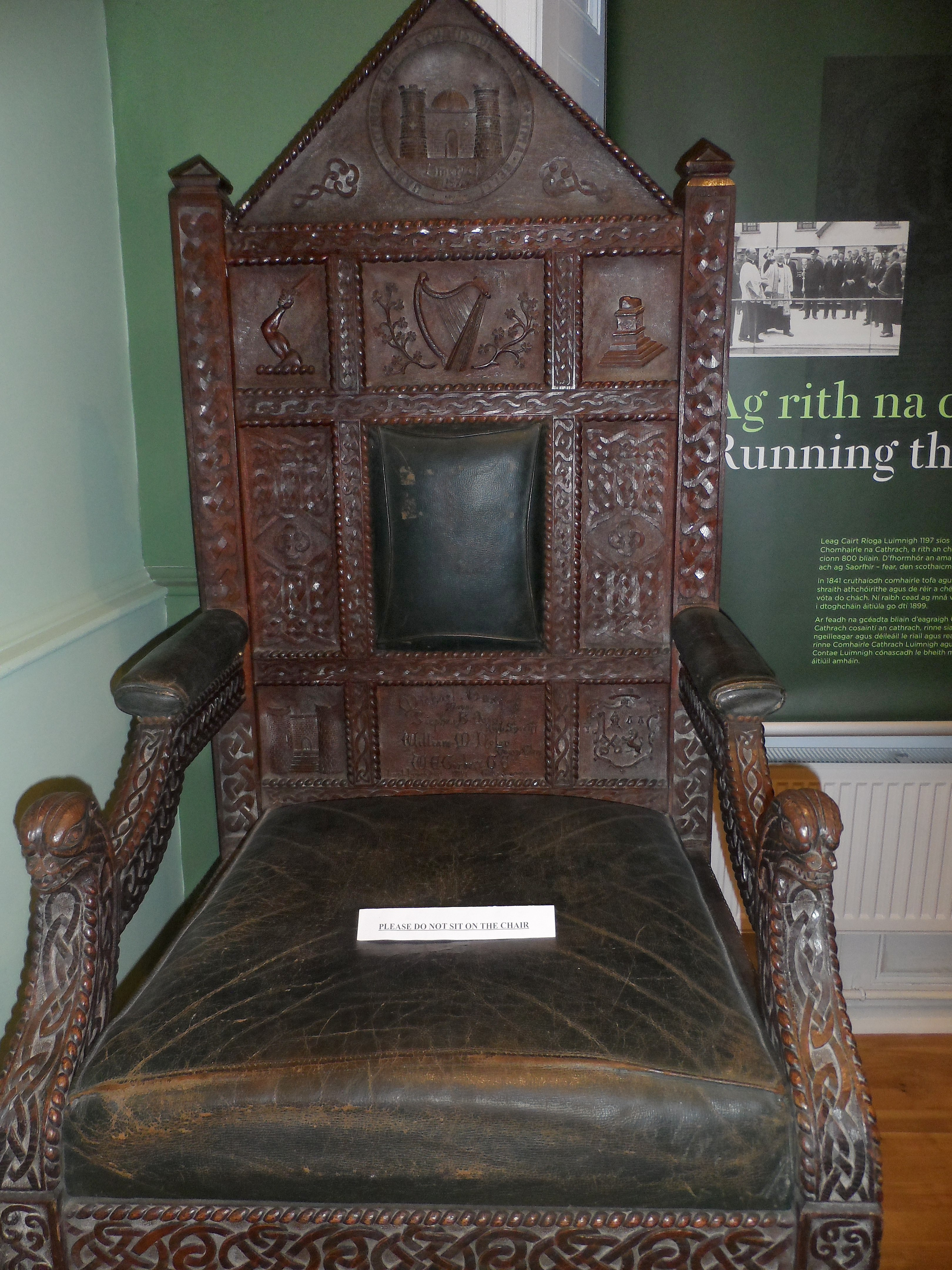
Throne of Limerick mayors

== List ==
=== Provosts prior to first charter ===
- 1195: John Spafford
- 1196: Alexander Barrett
- 1197: Henry Troy

=== Mayors ===
Year	Mayor	Notes
1197–1198	Adam Sarvant	
1199	Thomas Cropper	
1210	Roger Maij	
1211	John Cambitor	
1212	Walter Crop	
1213	Robert White	
1214	Siward Minutor	
1215	Siwardus D. Fferendona	
1216	J. Russell, alias Creagh	
1217	John Banbury	
1218	Thomas Fitz-Arthur	
1219	John Avenbrugger	
1230	Reynold de St. Jacobo	
1231	Nicholas Fitzsimons	
1234	Graldus Domiler	
1235	John de Hanco	
1236	John Poines	
1237	Henry Troy	
1241	Nicholas Fitz-Thois	
1255	John White	
1258	Thomas Crop	
1259	Adam Serjeant	
1260	Henry Troy	
1261	Robert Juvenis	
1262	Reginald de St. Jacobo	
1263	John Russell, alias Creaghe	
1264	John Banbery	
1265	Richard Troway	
1266	Geraldus de Mulier	
1267	John Hamilton	
1268	Robert Poynes	
1269	Henry Troy	
1270	Richard Milles Owen	
1271	John White	
1271	Gregory Wanybould	
1273	John Banbery	
1274	Gilbert Fitz-Thomas	
1275	Geraldus Millis Owen	
1276	Edmund Longan	
1277	Gregory Vonbonde	
1278	Morris Lisborne	
1279	Gerald de Murley	
1280	Maurice Blund	
1281	Richard Troy	
1282	Henry Troy	
1283	John Kildare	
1284	Gerald Morles	
1285	Edward Longane	
1294	Maurice Lisborn	
1295	Gerald de Morly	
1296	Richard Troy	
1297	Nicholas Fitzsimons	
1298	Gerald Morles	
1299	Richard Troy	
1300	John Kildare; Gerald Domilier	
1301	John de Hanco	
1302	Robert Poines	
1303	Henry Troy	
1304	Richard Milles Owen	
1305	John White	
1306	Thomas Bambury	
1307	William Loung	
1308	Robert Juvenis or Young Henry Troy	
1308	Gregory Wambold	
1309	Gregory Wainbold	
1310	John Banbery	
1311	Rowland Troy	
1312	John Creagh	
1313	Walter White	
1314	John Samtone; Robert Troy	
1315	Robert Juvenis; Gregory Wambold	
1316	John White; Maurice de Lisborn	
1317	Thomas Blake Kildare; Gregory Wambold	
1318	Nicholas White; William Prendergast	
1319	Philip Rainbold	
1320	Thomas Bambery	
1321	Richard Loung	
1322	Walter White	
1323	Roger de Lisborn	
1324	John Fitz-John White	
1325	John Fitz-John Le Blunt	
1326	John White	
1327	Gregory Wainbold	
1328	Henry Troy	
1329	Gregory Wyneband	
1330	Gregory Wyneband; John White	
1331	Gregory Wyneband	
1332	Thomas Bambery	
1333	Gregory Wainbold	
1334	Thomas Black of Kildare	
1335	Richard Milles Owen	
1336	John White	
1337	Gregory Wainbold	
1338	John Kildare	
1339	Thomas Kildare	
1340	Richard Milles Owen	
1341	Thomas Bambery	
1342	Robert White	
1343	Gregory Wambold	
1344	Simon Bouir; Gregory de Lisborn	
1345	Nicholas Fitz-Thomas; Simon Coney	
1346	Nicholas Fitzsymons	
1347	John Croft	
1348	Richard Miles Owen	
1349	Richard Miles Owen of Emly	
1350	Richard Millisse of Emly	
1351	Robert Creagh	
1352	Nicholas Fitz-Thomas	
1353	Nicholas Fitzsimons	
1354	John Nash	
1355	Nicholas Black of Kildare	
1356	John Kildare	
1357	Rd Bultingford	
1358	John Crofte	
1359	Richard Milles Owen	
1360	Richard Milles Owen jnr,	
1361	Nicholas Bakkeear	
1362	Robert Creaghe	
1363	John Bambery	
1364	Thomas Pill	
1365	John Fitz-Thomas Arthur	
1366	Thomas Bambery	
1367	John Baultingfourd	
1368	Gilbert Fitz-Thomas	
1369	John White	
1370	Gilbert F. Thomas Blake	
1371	Robert Creaugh	
1372	John Arthur	
1373	Nicholas Blackader	
1374	Richard Milles Owen	
1375	Wm. Bambery	
1376	Richard Bultingfourd	
1377	Thomas Kildare	
1378	William White	
1379	Thomas Kildare	
1380	Richard Bultingford	
1381	John Banbery	
1382	John White	
1383	Richd. Troy	
1384	Thomas Kildare	
1385	Thom. Pill	
1386	Richard Bultingfourd	
1387	John White	
1388	Thomas Malby	
1389	John White	
1390	Richard Baltingford	
1391	John White	
1392	John Kildare	
1393	Thomas Kildare	
1394	Thomas Kildare	
1395	Walter Daniel	
1396	Richard Bullingfourd	
1397	Thomas Kildare	
1398	Thomas Kildare	
1399	Nicholas Black	
1400	John Arthur	
1401	Peter Loftus	
1402	Thomas Spicer	
1403	John Arthur	
1404	John Arthur, 27 June; John Spofford, 6 Dec.	
1405	Thomas Kildare	
1406	unknown	
1407	Thomas Comyn	
1408	Thomas Comyn	
1409	Thomas Comyn	
1410	John Bambery	
1411	Thomas Troy	
1412	unknown	
1413	Thomas Comyn	
1414	Thomas White	
1415	Peter Loftus	
1416	Thomas Comyn	
1417	Thomas Comyn	
1418	John Gale alias Spafford	
1419	John Spafford	
1420	Richard Troy	
1421	Thomas Arthur	
1422	Richd. Troy	
1423	Spafford	
1424	Pires Loftus	
1425	Richard Troy	
1426	Thomas Arthur	
1427	Nicholas Stritch	
1428	Thomas Comyn	
1429	unknown	
1430	Richard Troy	
1431	William Arthur	
1432	John Spafford	
1433	Thomas Bambery	
1434	William Wailsh	
1435	Richard Fox	
1436	Nicholas Arthur	
1437	William Yong	
1438	Thomas Comyn	
1439	Walter Yong	
1440	William Arthur	
1441	William Arthur	
1442	Nicholas Arthur	
1443	Richard Fox	
1444	Nicholas Arthur	
1445	Richard Arthur	
1446	Nicholas Arthur	
1447	William Loftus	
1448	William Comyn	
1449	William Arthur	
1450	Thomas Arthur	
1451	Richard Arthur	
1452	Nicholas Arthur	
1453	Thomas Barthon	
1454	Nicholas Arthur	
1455	William Longe	
1456	Edmond Howell	
1457	Nicholas Arthur	
1458	Nicholas Arthur	
1459	William Comyn	
1460	Richard Arthur	
1461	Patrick Torger	
1462	Nich. Fitz-Thomas Arthur	
1463	Nicholas Arthur	
1464	Nicholas Arthur	
1465	Patrick Torger	
1466	Thomas Arthur	
1467	Thomas Arthur	
1468	William Comyn	
1469	Thomas Arthur	
1470	Henry Creagh; David Creagh	
1471	John Arthur	
1472	Patrick Arthur	
1473	William Comyn	
1474	John Arthur	
1475	David Creagh	
1476	Patrick Arthur	
1477	Daniel Crevagh	
1478	Thomas Arthur	
1479	Thomas Arthur	
1480	John Arthur	
1481	John Comyn	
1482	David Arthur	
1483	John Fitz-Nicholas Arthur	
1484	Walter Whyte	
1485	William Harold	
1486	John Arthur	
1487	John Arthur	
1488	David Creagh	
1489	Thomas Arthur	
1490	Patrick Arthur	
1491	David Creagh	
1492	Maurice Stacpol	
1493	Edmond Lodge	
1494	Georg Fitz-Nicholas Arthur	
1495	Edmond Longe	
1496	George Comyn	
1497	George Comyn	
1498	William Harold	
1499	David Roche	
1500	Philip Stackpol	
1501	Christopher Arthur	
1502	John Creagh	
1503	Nicholas Stretch	
1504	Nicholas Stretch	
1505	William Harold	
1506	William Arthur	
1507	William Creagh	
1508	Nicholas Fitz-Patrick Fox	
1509	Nich. Thos. Fitz-W. Arthur	
1510	Nicholas Stretch	
1511	Thomas Roch	
1512	Robert Harrold	
1513	Robert Stackpol	
1514	Richard Fox	
1515	Thomas Comyn	
1516	Nicholas Harrold	
1517	Nicholas Harrold	
1518	David Comyn	
1519	John Rocheford	
1520	Walter Ryce	
1521	David Comyn	
1522	David Whyte	
1523	David Roche	
1524	Christopher Arthur	
1525	James Harrold	
1526	Thomas Yong	
1527	Nicholas Creagh	
1528	Nicholas Stretch	
1529	Patrick Fanning	
1530	Stephen Creagh	
1531	Edmond Harrold	
1532	Daniel Fitz-George Arthur	
1533	Thomas Yong	
1534	John Fitz-Nicholas Arthur	
1535	Edmond Sexton	Ancestor of the Pery family including Viscount Pery.
1536	Bartholomew Stretch	
1537	Nicholas Comyn	
1538	William Fanning	
1539	Leonard Creagh	
1540	Dominick Whyte	
1541	Patrick Everard	
1542	George Crevagh	
1543	David Whyte	
1544	James Harrold	
1545	Dominick Whyte	
1546	Stephen Creagh	
1547	John Fitz-Nicholas Arthur	
1548	William Stretch	
1549	John Fitzgeo. Stretch	
1550	James Fox	
1551	James Creagh for 1 month James Fox for 2 months	
1552	William Stretch	
1553	William Verdune	
1554	James Stretch	
1555	John Stackpol	
1557	Clement Fanning	
1558	Edward Fitz-Daniel Arthur	
1559	Daniel Comyn	
1560	Peter Fitz-Leonard Creagh	
1561	Richard Fanning	
1562	Nicholas Whyte	
1563	Nicholas Harrold	
1564	George Roche	
1565	Thomas Fitz-John Arthur	
1567	Christopher Creagh	
1568	Dominick Fanning	
1569	Philip Rochford	
1570	John Fitz-Stephen Comyn	
1571	Geo. Fitz-William Fanning	
1572	Richard Stretch	
1573	Thoms Fitz-John Arthur	
1574	Thomas Harrold	
1575	Roger Everard	
1576	Stpn. Fitz-Dominick Whyte	
1577	Thomas Fitz-John Arthur	
1578	John Woulfe	
1579	Nicholas Fitz-Bw.Stretch	
1580	John Fitz-Gerald Roche	
1581	James Fitz-John Galway	
1582	John Fitz-Bw. Stretch	
1583	Nicholas Comyn	
1584	James Fanning	
1585	Stephen Sexten	
1586	Thomas Yong	
1587	George Fanning	
1588	Jordan Roche	
1589	Nicholas Bourke	
1590	Thomas Fitz-William Stretch	
1591	Oliver Bourke	
1592	Nicholas Fitz-Thomas Arthur	
1593	Peter Fitz-Dominick Creagh	
1594	John Fitz-Bw. Stretch	
1595	James Whyte died 1st month Peter Fitz-John Creagh	
1596	Robert Whyte	
1597	Dominick Fitzjordan Roche	
1598	James Cromwell	
1599	William Fitz-John Stretch	
1600	Galfridus (Sir Geoffrey) Galway	
1601	Stephen Roche	
1602	Philip Roch	
1603	Nicholas Bourke	
1604	James Galway	
1605	Edmund Fox for 2 months James Woulf	
1606	Edmund Sexten	
1607	Nicholas Arthur	
1608	Patrick Arthur	
1609	David Whyte	
1610	Clement Fanning	Grandfather of Dominick Fanning (mayor 1641).
1611	David Comyn; Edmund Sexton	
1612	Wm. Myeagh, 4 months Christopher Creagh, 8 months	
1613	Dominick Fitz-Peter Creagh	
1614	Michael Walter, 5 months James Galway	
1615	William Stretch, 14 days Simon Fanning; David Comyn	
1616	James Galway; Dominick Roche; Christopher Creagh	
1617	John Fitz-John Stretch	
1618	Dominick Roche; Peter Fitz-Peter Whyte	
1619	Edward Sexten	
1620	Henry Barkley	
1621	Dominick Roche	
1622	John Fitz-John Stretch	
1623	Edward Sexten	
1624	David Fitz-Nicholas Comyn	
1625	Henry Barkley	
1626	James Fitz-Nicholas Bourke	
1627	James Fitz-John Stretch	
1628	Peter Fitz-Peter Creagh	
1629	Dr. Domk. Fitz-David Whyte	
1630	Nicholas Fanning	
1631	Andrew Fitz-Andrew Creagh	
1632	James Lawless	
1633	John Meyeagh	
1634	Peter (or Pierce) Creagh Fitz-Andrew	
1635	Thomas Fitz-Martin Arthur	
1636	Sir Domk. Fitz-Bw. Whyte	
1637	James Fitz-James Whyte	
1638	Robert Lawless	
1639	Jordan Roch (the younger)	
1640	William Fitz-Ed. Comyn	
1641	Dominick Fitz-Simon Fanning	Grandson of Clement Fanning (mayor 1610). Executed by the English in 1651 for his role in the Irish Rebellion of 1641.
1642	Peter Fitz-Pierce Creagh	
1643	Dominick Fitz-David Whyte	
1644	Francis Fanning	
1645	John Fitz-Thomas Bourke	
1646	Dominick Fitz-Stephen Fanning	
1647	Peter (Pierce) Creagh Fitz-Andrew	
1648	Sir Nicholas Fitz-David Comyn	
1649	John Fitz-Wm. Creagh	
1650	Thomas Fitz-Patrick Creagh	
1651	Peter Fitz-Peter Creagh or Pierse Creagh	Ancestor of the Creagh family of Dangan, County Clare.
1656	Colonel Henry Ingolsby	
1657	Captain Ralf Wilson	
1658	William Yarwell	
1659	Wm. Hartwell	
1660	Thomas Miller	
1661	John Comyn	
1662	Henry Bindon	
1663	Sir Ralph Wilson	
1664	Sir Ralph Wilson	
1665	Sir Wm. King	
1666	Samuel Foxon	
1667	Sir Ralph Wilson	
1668	Sir Ralph Wilson	
1669	E. Werendoght	
1670	R. Studdendoght	
1671	John Bourin	
1672	Sir Geo. Ingoldsby	
1673	Wm. York	
1674	Wm. York	
1675	Edward Clarke	
1676	Capt. Humphrey Hartwell	
1677	Capt. Humphrey Hartwell	
1678	Wm. York	
1679	Sir William King	
1680	Anthony Bartlett	
1681	Fras. Whitamor	
1682	Wm. Gribble	
1683	Wm. Gribble	
1684	Robert Smyth	
1685	George Roche	
1686	George Roche	
1687	Robert Hannan	
1688	Robert Hannan	
1689	Thomas Harrold	
1690	John Power	
1691	George Roche	
1692	John Craven	
1693	John Foord	
1694	Edward Waight/Wight	Father of mayor John Wight.
1695	Thomas Rose	Of Devonshire origins, lived in Morgans North, County Limerick.
1696	Simon White	His second son John was an estate owner from Cappawhite, County Tipperary.
1697	John Young	
1698	James Robinson	
1699	Robert Twigg	
1700	Richard Pope	
1701	William Davis	
1702	George Roche (younger)	
1703	John Vincent	
1704	Richard Lyllis	
1705	Tock Roch	
1706	John Higgins	
1707	Randel Holland	
1708	Richard Craven	
1709	Rawly Colpoys	
1710	Pierse Piercy	
1711	Edward Waight/Wight	Same as in 1694.
1712	William Butler	
1713	Ezechias Holland	
1714	William Franklin	
1715	George Sexton	
1716	Francis Sergeant	
1717	George Bridgeman	
1718	William Medcaff	
1719	Richard Davis	
1720	John Seamor	
1721	George Roche	MP for Limerick City (1713-1727)
1722	Joseph Wilson	
1723	Tock Roche	
1724	Tock Roche	
1725	John Carr	
1726	Lieut-Gen Thomas Pierce	
1727	John Vincent	
1728	Arthur Vincent	
1729	Walter Parker	
1730	William Carr	
1731	Philip Rawson	
1732	Charles Smyth	MP for Limerick City (1731-1776)
1733	William Wilson	
1734	Richard Maunsell	
1735	George Wright	
1736	Thomas Vincent	
1737	Thomas Southwell	
1738	George Sexton	
1739	Isaac Clampett	
1740	Joseph Roche; Thomas Vincent	
1741	John Wight	Son of mayor Edward Wight.
1742	John Robinson	
1743	Arthur Roche	
1744	Henry Long	
1745	Robert Cripps	
1746	Henry Ivers	
1747	John Ingram	
1748	John Jones	
1749	David Roch	
1750	Henry Southwell MP	
1751	James Smyth	
1752	John Sheppard	
1753	Peter Sargent	
1754	John Gough	
1755	Stepney Rawson Stepney	
1756	Arthur Roch	
1757	Andrew Shepherd	
1758	Sexten Baylee	His nephew Henry was owner of Mount Baylee in Knockatinty, County Clare
1759	Francis Sargent	
1760	Arthur Roche	
1761	George Vincent	A confirmation of arms was made to his descendants on 1 October 1873.
1762	Edward Villiers	
1763	Robert Hallam	
1764	Thomas Smyth	
1765	George Sexton, junior	
1766	Joseph Cripps	
1767	Thomas Vereker	
1768	John Barrett	
1769	John Vereker	
1770	Exham Vincent	
1771	Christopher Carr Christopher	
1772	Arthur Roche; George Roche	
1773	Joseph Johns	
1774	Richard Hart	
1775	William Gabbett	
1776	Thomas Smyth	
1777	Walter Widenham	
1778	Philip Smyth	
1779	Eaton Maunsell	
1780	F. Sargent James	
1781	Thomas Carpenter	
1782	George Smyth	
1783	Alexander Franklin	
1784	Thomas Pearse	
1785	Christopher Knight	
1786	William Fitzgerald	
1787	John Creagh	
1788	Richard Maunsell	
1789	Joseph Gabbett	
1790	John Minchin	
1791	Thomas Shepherd	
1792	Benjamin Frend	
1793	Henry D'Esterre	
1794	Henry D'Esterre	
1795	Thomas Gabbett	
1796	John Harrison; Joseph Cripps	
1797	Joseph Cripps	
1798	Frederick Lloyd	
1799	Frederick Lloyd	
1800	Ralph Westropp	Married Harriet, sister of Charles Vereker, 2nd Viscount Gort. Owner of Coolreagh in Kilnoe.
1801	Ralph Westropp	Married Harriet, sister of Charles Vereker, 2nd Viscount Gort. Owner of Coolreagh in Kilnoe.
1802	Joseph Sargent	
1803	Arthur Vincent	
1804	Robert Briscoe	
1805	William Fosbery	
1806	Richard Harte	
1807	Kilner Brooke Brasier	
1808	John Cripps	
1809	Francis Lloyd	
1810	Francis Lloyd	
1811	William Hunt	
1812	Andrew Watson	
1813	Thomas S. Wilkinson	
1814	Edward Moroney	
1815	John Vereker	
1816	John Vereker	
1817	John Vereker	
1818	Joseph Gabbett	
1819	Joseph Gabbett	
1820	Sir Christopher Marrett	
1821	Thomas Ormsby	
1822	D. F. G. Mahony	
1823	Henry Watson	
1824	Henry Watson	
1825	Henry Watson	
1826	Nicholas Mahon	
1827	Thomas Jervis	
1828	Vere Hunt	
1829	Henry Rose	
1830	John Cripps	
1831	John Vereker	
1832	John Vereker	
1833	John Vereker, junior	
1834	John J. Piercy	
1835	William Gibson	
1836	John Vereker, junior	
1837	Edmond Moroney	
1838	Garrett Hugh Fitzgerald	
1839	Richard Franklin	
1840	Henry Vereker Lloyd	
1841	C. S. Vereker	
1842	Martin Honan	Lived in Quinsborough in Parteen townland, County Clare in 1837.
1843	Martin Honan	Lived in Quinsborough in Parteen townland, County Clare in 1837.
1844	Pierse Shannon; William J. Geary	
1845	William J. Geary	
1846	E. F. G. Ryan	
1847	Thomas Wallnutt	
1848	Michael Quin	Holder of Ballynisky townland, County Limerick, as of Griffith's Valuation.
1849	John Boyse; Laurence Quinlivan	
1850	Laurence Quinlivan	
1851	Thaddeus McDonnell	
1852	Dr Thomas Kane	
1853	William H. Hall	
1854	Henry Watson	
1855	Henry O'Shea	
1856	James Spaight	
1857	Dr Thomas Kane	
1858	Edmund Gabbett	
1859	Michael R. Ryan	
1860	William Fitzgerald; T. McDonnell; John T. McSheehy	
1861	John T. McSheehy	
1862	William Lane-Joynt	
1863	Robert MacMahon	
1864	Eugene O'Callaghan	
1865	John Richard Tinsley	
1866	Peter Tait	
1867	Peter Tait	
1868	Peter Tait; Thomas Elliot Carte	
1869	Thomas Boyse	
1870	William Spillane JP DL	Educated at Crescent College.
1871	Robert McDonnell	
1872	John Watson Mahony; John J. Cleary	
1873	John J. Cleary	
1874	John J. Cleary	
1875	Ambrose Hall	As of 1906, lived in Ross estate in O'Briensbridge civil parish, County Clare.
1876	John Francis Walker	
1877	James Spaight	
1878	Stephen Hastings	
1879	Michael O'Gorman	
1880	Michael O'Gorman	
1881	Thomas George O'Sullivan	
1882	Jerome Counihan	
1883	Jerome Counihan	
1884	Maurice Lenihan	
1885	Stephen O'Mara (nationalist)	
1886	Stephen O'Mara MP (nationalist)	
1887	Francis Arthur O'Keefe	
1888	Francis Arthur O'Keefe MP	
1889	Francis Arthur O'Keefe MP	
1890	William J. O'Donnell	
1891	Patrick Riordan	
1892	Denis F. McNamara	
1893	Bryan O'Donnell	
1894	Bryan O'Donnell	
1895	Bryan O'Donnell; William Nolan	
1896	William Nolan; Michael Cusack	
1897	Michael Cusack	
1898–1899	Michael Cusack	

=== 1899–2014 ===
Year	Mayor	Party	Notes
1899–1902	John Daly	Irish National League	MP for Limerick City (1895) and a leader of the Irish Republican Brotherhood
1902–1903	James F. Barry	Independent	Later a member of the Labour Party.
1903–1905	Michael Donnelly	Independent	
1905–1907	Michael Joyce	Irish Parliamentary	MP for Limerick City (1900–1918)
1907–1908	John Kerr	Irish Parliamentary	
1908–1910	Thomas Donnellan	Irish Parliamentary	
1910–1913	Timothy Ryan	United Irish League	
1913–1916	Philip O'Donovan	Irish Parliamentary	Became Limerick Corporation Alderman for Irishtown Ward in January 1911.
1916–1918	Sir Stephen Quin	Irish Unionist	
1918–1920	Phons O'Mara	Irish Parliamentary	Son of Senator Stephen O'Mara.
1920–1921	Michael O'Callaghan	Sinn Féin	Murdered alongside George Clancy. His sister-in-law, Deputy Mayor Maire O'Donovan was afterwards co-opted to his Limerick City Council seat.
1921	George Clancy	Sinn Féin	Murdered by Black and Tans on 7 March 1921
1921–1923	Stephen M. O'Mara	Sinn Féin	Mary O'Donovan served as Deputy Mayor, 21 May 1921 to 30 January 1922; Anti-Treaty Sinn Féin from 1922. Resigned 1 October 1923 after defeat in the Irish Civil War
1923–1925	Bob de Courcy	Republican	Resigned 30 June 1925
1925–1927	Paul O'Brien	Cumann na nGaedheal	Previously a local manager at Texaco and stage actor. Limerick City Councillor 1920–1931.
1927–1928	John George O'Brien	Cumann na nGaedheal	Died on 18 or 19 November 1944.
1928–1930	Michael Keyes	Labour	Father of Christopher P. Keyes (Mayor 1957–1958)
1930–1933	Patrick Donnellan	Cumann na nGaedheal	
1933–1934	Patrick F. Quinlan	Cumann na nGaedheal	
1934	Patrick F. Quinlan	Independent	
1934–1936	James M. Casey	Labour	He led the Limerick Soviet in 1919. Previously, he had taken over mayoral duties after the 1921 George Clancy massacre. After 32 years of lobbying by his grandson, James Casey Walk was named after him in 2000.
1936–1941	Daniel Bourke	Fianna Fáil	Teachta Dála for Limerick from 1927–1952
1941–1943	Desmond J. O'Malley, Snr	Fianna Fáil	The Old Crescentian was elected Limerick City Councillor in 1935.
1943–1944	James McQuane	Labour	
1944–1945	James Reidy	Fine Gael	
1945–1946	Michael Hartney	Fianna Fáil	Limerick City Councillor 1922–1950. His first wife was killed in the Siege of Adare.
1946–1947	John C. Hickey	Fianna Fáil	
1947–1948	Patrick O'Connell	Fianna Fáil	
1948–1949	Michael B. O'Malley	Fianna Fáil	
1949–1950	Gerard B. Dillon	Fianna Fáil	
1950–1951	Kevin Bradshaw	Fianna Fáil	First term. His election was described as one of the closest in the position's history.
1951–1952	Stephen Coughlan	Clann na Poblachta	TD for Limerick East (1961–1977)
1952–1953	Kevin Bradshaw	Fianna Fáil	Second term
1953–1954	John Carew	Fine Gael	First term
1954–1957	Ted Russell	Clann na Poblachta	
1957–1958	Christopher P. Keyes	Labour	Son of Michael Keyes (Mayor 1928–1930)
1958–1959	Joseph P. "Rory" Liddy	Fianna Fáil	First term
1959–1960	John Carew	Fine Gael	Second term
1960–1961	Paddy Kelly	Fine Gael	
1961	Donogh O'Malley	Fianna Fáil	Resigned November 1961. TD for Limerick East (1954–1968)
1961–1962	Frank Glasgow	Fianna Fáil	Limerick City Councillor from 1951, he played a significant role in the Gaelic revival movement.
1962–1964	Frances Condell	Independent	First female Mayor
1964–1965	John Danagher	Clann na Poblachta	Teacher at a national school
1965–1966	Frank Leddin	Labour	First term. City Councillor 1960–1997. Nephew of Michael Keyes (Mayor 1928–1930)
1966–1967	Vincent Feeney	Fianna Fáil	
1967–1968	Ted Russell	Fine Gael	
1968–1969	Jack Bourke	Fianna Fáil	
1969–1970	Stephen Coughlan	Labour	Second term
1970–1971	Joseph P. "Rory" Liddy	Fianna Fáil	Second term
1971–1972	Gus O'Driscoll	Fine Gael	
1972–1973	Paddy Kiely	Fianna Fáil	Survived a knife attack on 27 November 1993.
1973–1974	Michael Lipper	Labour	TD for Limerick East (1977–1981)
1974–1975	Pat Kennedy	Fine Gael	
1975–1976	Thady Coughlan	Labour	
1976–1977	Ted Russell	Fine Gael	
1977–1978	Frank Prendergast	Labour	First term. TD for Limerick East 1982–1989
1978–1980	Bobby Byrne	Fine Gael	
1980–1981	Clem Casey	Fianna Fáil	
1981–1982	Thomas "Tommy" Allen	Labour	Previously a train driver, and later founder of a printing company. First Mayor from Southill.
1982–1983	Tony Bromell	Fianna Fáil	Senator 1988–1989
1983–1984	Terry Kelly	Fine Gael	Sister of Tánaiste Peter Barry.
1984–1985	Frank Prendergast	Labour	Second term
1985–1986	Pat Kennedy	Fine Gael	
1986–1987	Jack Bourke	Fianna Fáil	Second term
1987–1988	Tim Leddin	Fine Gael	Nephew of Michael Keyes (Mayor 1928–1930). Brother of Frank Leddin (Mayor 1965–1966)
1988–1989	Paddy Madden	Fianna Fáil	First term
1989–1990	Gus O'Driscoll	Fine Gael	
1990–1991	Paddy Madden	Fianna Fáil	Second term. Second Mayor to return after a one-year lapse.
1991–1992	Jim Kemmy	Labour	TD for Limerick East (1981–1982; 1987–1997)
1992–1993	John Quinn	Progressive Democrats	
1993–1994	Jan O'Sullivan	Labour	Senator (1993–1997) and later TD for Limerick East (1998–2011) and Limerick City (2011–2020)
1994–1995	Dick Sadlier	Progressive Democrats	
1995–1996	Jim Kemmy	Labour	Second term
1996–1997	Kieran O'Hanlon	Fianna Fáil	
1997–1998	Frank Leddin	Labour	Second term
1998–1999	Joe Harrington	Independent	
1999–2000	Jack Bourke	Fianna Fáil	Third term
2000–2001	John Ryan	Labour	
2001–2002	Dick Sadlier	Fianna Fáil	
2002–2003	John Cronin	Fianna Fáil	
2003–2004	Dick Sadlier	Fianna Fáil	
2004–2005	Michael Hourigan	Fine Gael	
2005–2006	Diarmuid Scully	Fine Gael	Admiral of the Shannon River.
2006–2007	Joe Leddin	Labour	Grand-nephew of Michael Keyes (Mayor 1928–1930)
2007–2008	Ger Fahy	Fine Gael	
2008–2009	John Gilligan	Independent	
2009–2010	Kevin Kiely	Fine Gael	
2010–2011	Maria Byrne	Fine Gael	
2011–2012	Jim Long	Fine Gael	Became a City Councillor in 2003.
2012–2013	Gerry McLoughlin	Labour	
2013–2014	Kathleen Leddin	Independent	Wife of Tim Leddin (Mayor 1987–1988)

=== Mayor of the City and County of Limerick ===
Year	Mayor	Party
2014–2015	Kevin Sheahan	Fianna Fáil
2015–2016	Liam Galvin	Fine Gael
2016–2017	Kieran O'Hanlon	Fianna Fáil
2017–2018	Stephen Keary	Fine Gael
2018–2019	James Collins	Fianna Fáil
2019–2020	Michael Sheahan	Fine Gael
2020–2021	Michael Collins	Fianna Fáil
2021–2022	Daniel Butler	Fine Gael
2022–2023	Francis Foley	Fianna Fáil
2023–2024	Gerald Mitchell	Fine Gael

=== Mayor of Limerick ===
Directly elected office

Year	Mayor	Party
2024–present	John Moran	Independent
