= Stockton =

Stockton may refer to:

== Places ==
=== Australia ===
- Stockton, New South Wales
- Stockton, Queensland, a locality in the Cassowary Coast Region

=== Canada ===
- Stockton, Manitoba, a populated place

=== New Zealand ===
- Stockton, New Zealand

=== United Kingdom ===
- Stockton, Cheshire
- Stockton, Norfolk
- Stockton, Chirbury with Brompton, Shropshire
- Stockton, Telford and Wrekin, a location in Shropshire; see List of United Kingdom locations
- Stockton, Worfield, Shropshire
- Stockton, Warwickshire
- Stockton, Wiltshire
- Stockton Heath, a suburb of Warrington, Cheshire
- Stockton-on-Tees, County Durham, the largest town in the UK with this name
- Stockton on Teme, Worcestershire
- Stockton-on-the-Forest, North Yorkshire

=== United States ===
- Stockton, Alabama
- Stockton, California, the largest US city named Stockton
- Fort Stockton (San Diego, California) historical Fort
- Stockton, Camden, a neighborhood in Camden, New Jersey
- Stockton, Georgia
- Stockton, Illinois
- Stockton, Indiana
- Stockton, Iowa
- Stockton, Kansas
- Stockton, Maryland
- Stockton, Minnesota
- Stockton, Missouri
- Stockton, New Jersey
- Stockton, New York, a town and hamlet therein
- Stockton, San Diego, a neighborhood in San Diego, California
- Stockton, Utah
- Stockton, Wisconsin, a town
  - Stockton (community), Wisconsin, an unincorporated community
- Fort Stockton, Texas
- Stockton Springs, Maine
- Stockton Street (San Francisco), California, United States
- Stockton Township (disambiguation)

== People ==
- Stockton (surname)
- Earl of Stockton
- Stockton Rush (1962–2023), American businessman and CEO
- John Stockton, American former basketball player for the Utah Jazz

== Transportation ==
- Stockton Airport (disambiguation)
- Stockton and Darlington Railway, England
- Stockton – San Joaquin Street (Amtrak station), California
- Stockton station (disambiguation)

== Other uses ==
- Stockton (Woodville, North Carolina), an historic plantation house
- Stockton University, New Jersey, United States
- USS Stockton

== See also ==
- Justice Stockton (disambiguation)
