= John Prendergast-Smyth, 1st Viscount Gort =

Irish politician (1742–1817)

John Prendergast-Smyth, 1st Viscount Gort (1742 – 23 May 1817) was an Irish politician.

Born John Smyth, Gort was the son of Charles Smyth, Member of the Irish Parliament for Limerick City, and Elizabeth Prendergast. His paternal grandparents were Thomas Smyth, Bishop of Limerick, and Dorothea Burgh (daughter of Ulysses Burgh), and his paternal uncles included the lawyer George Smyth and Arthur Smyth, Archbishop of Dublin. His maternal grandparents were Sir Thomas Prendergast, 1st Baronet, who was killed in action at the Battle of Malplaquet in 1709, and Penelope Cadogan, sister of William Cadogan, 1st Earl Cadogan.

In 1760 Gort succeeded to the estates of his maternal uncle Thomas Prendergast, 2nd Baronet, and assumed the surname of Prendergast in lieu of Smyth. However, in 1785, after the death of his brother Thomas Smyth MP, he resumed the surname of Smyth in addition to that of Prendergast.

Gort was a Colonel in the Limerick Militia and sat as a Member of the Irish House of Commons for Carlow from 1776 to 1783 and for Limerick City between 1785 and 1798. In 1810 he was raised to the Peerage of Ireland as Baron Kiltarton, of Gort in the County of Galway, and in 1816 he was further honoured when he was made Viscount Gort, also in the Peerage of Ireland. Both titles were created with remainder to his nephew Charles Vereker, the son of his sister Juliana by her marriage with Thomas Vereker. Lord Gort also served as Governor of County Galway from 1812 to 1817. He died unmarried on 23 May 1817, and was succeeded in his titles according to the special remainder by his nephew Charles Vereker.

Parliament of Ireland
Preceded by Edward Hoare; James Somerville	Member of Parliament for Carlow; 1776–1783; With: John Ponsonby 1776; Arthur Dawson 1776–1783	Succeeded by John Browne; Charles des Voeux
Preceded by Edmund Pery; Thomas Smyth	Member of Parliament for Limerick City; 1785–1798; With: Thomas Smyth 1785–1786; Edmund Pery 1786–1794; Charles Vereker 1794–1798	Succeeded by Henry Deane Grady; Charles Vereker
Peerage of Ireland
New creation	Viscount Gort; 1st creation 1816–1817	Succeeded by Charles Vereker
New creation	Baron Kiltarton; 1810–1817	Succeeded by Charles Vereker
