= John Garnett (bishop) =

English bishop

John Garnett (1707/08–1782) was an English bishop of Clogher in the Church of Ireland.

== Life ==
Garnett was born at Lambeth in 1707/8. His father, John Garnett, was rector of Sigglesthorne, in the East Riding of Yorkshire. His grandfather had been vicar of Kilham, and his great-grandfather a merchant in Newcastle. Educated at a school in Beverley, Yorkshire, he was admitted to St John's College, Cambridge in 1725, though he migrated to Sidney Sussex College in September 1728. Graduating B.A. in 1728/9 and M.A. in 1732, he became a fellow of Sidney Sussex in 1730, and was Lady Margaret preacher to the university from 1744 to 1752.

In 1751 Garnett went to Ireland as chaplain to the Lord Lieutenant, Lionel Sackville, 1st Duke of Dorset. In 1752 he became Bishop of Ferns and Leighlin; he was translated to Clogher in 1758, and remained bishop of Clogher until his death. In 1765 he was touted as a possible successor to William Carmichael as Archbishop of Dublin, though the Irishman Arthur Smyth was ultimately appointed.

Garnett died on 1 March 1782 at his home in Leinster Street, Dublin. There is a mural tablet to his memory in the chancel of St Lawrence's Church, Sigglesthorne, and a painting of him in St John's College, Cambridge.

Garnett married Dorothea, the youngest daughter of Sir Thomas Molyneux, 1st Baronet. According to the DNB, the John Garnett who was appointed dean of Exeter in February 1810, and died 11 March 1813, in his sixty-fifth year, was the Bishop's son.

== Reputation ==
Garnett was a patron of the clergyman Philip Skelton: according to Skelton's biographer Samuel Burdy, Skelton "would have continued in a wild part of the country all his days had not Providence placed Dr. Garnett in the see of Clogher, who was remarkable for promoting men distinguished for literary qualifications." Elsewhere Burdy praised Garnett as "a pious, humble, good-natured man, a generous encourager of literature, kind to his domestics, and justly esteemed by all those who had an opportunity of knowing his virtues". Thomas Campbell corroborated this account in his Philosophical Survey of the South of Ireland (1777).

== Works ==
The only work of Garnett, besides some occasional sermons, was his prolix Dissertation on the Book of Job (1749; second edition 1752). On seeing it at the Duke of Newcastle's, to whom it was dedicated, Lord Morton remarked that it was 'a very proper book for the ante-chamber of a prime minister.' Garnett's theory, by which the book of Job is referred to the period of the Babylonian captivity, and Job regarded as the type of the oppressed nation of Israel, was original for an eighteenth-century divine.

Church of Ireland titles
Preceded by Robert Downes	Bishop of Ferns and Leighlin; 1752–1758	Succeeded by William Carmichael
Preceded by Robert Clayton	Bishop of Clogher; 1758–1782	Succeeded by Sir John Hotham, 9th Baronet
