= Thomas Smyth (Limerick MP) =

Irish politician

Thomas Smyth (1740 – 14 January 1785) was an Irish politician.

== Life ==
He was Mayor of Limerick twice (in 1764 and 1776) and Member of Parliament for Limerick City from 1776 until his death. He was appointed High Sheriff of County Limerick for 1770. He was also Colonel of the Limerick Militia.

He was succeeded in the constituency and in militia by his brother John Prendergast Smyth. John had also inherited the estates of their uncle, Sir Thomas Prendergast, 2nd Baronet, even though Thomas was the oldest son. John was later ennobled as the first Viscount Gort.

== Family ==
Smyth was the eldest son of Charles Smyth, MP for Limerick City, and Elizabeth Prendergast. His paternal grandparents were Thomas Smyth, Bishop of Limerick, and Dorothea Burgh (daughter of Ulysses Burgh), and his paternal uncles included the lawyer George Smyth and Arthur Smyth, Archbishop of Dublin. His maternal grandparents were Sir Thomas Prendergast, 1st Baronet, who was killed in action at the Battle of Malplaquet in 1709, and Penelope Cadogan, sister of William Cadogan, 1st Earl Cadogan.

Smyth died unmarried at Bordeaux, but fathered four children, all of whom bore the surname Stuart, including the Indian army officer Charles "Hindoo" Stuart.

Parliament of Ireland
Preceded by Edmund Sexton Pery; Charles Smyth	Member of Parliament for Limerick City; 1776–1785; With: Edmund Sexton Pery	Succeeded by John Prendergast Smyth; Edmund Henry Pery
