= Henry Deane Grady =

Irish politician

Henry Deane Grady (1764-1847), was a Member of Parliament for Limerick in both the Parliament of Ireland and the Parliament of the United Kingdom. His name is also sometimes given as O'Grady.

He was born in Limerick about 1764, the son of Standish Grady and Frances Deane. After studying law, he began his career as a barrister in 1787. In 1794 he married Dorcas Spread of Ballycannon, County Cork; they had three sons and five daughters. In 1821 Grady's daughter Amelia married Edward Chichester, Dean of Raphoe, who in 1871 succeeded as Marquess of Donegall. (Note: Sources vary as to whether the family's name is "Grady" or "O'Grady"; the daughter is listed elsewhere as "O'Grady.")

Grady was a member of the Royal Dublin Society, and a noted duelist. He was elected to the Irish parliament for Limerick City in 1797.

Despite the potential political cost to himself, Grady supported the Union with Great Britain. In 1799, he wrote, "I suffer much in my expectations because, if I pursue my profession, I must remain in this country, and it is idle to say that an individual here, however industrious or intelligent as a barrister, unknown to the British minister in the Imperial Parliament, can expect that situation of which, as a member of the Irish parliament, time, zeal and fitness for judicial situation acquired at least through practice, might induce a reasonable hope...."

In the general election of 1801, Grady was elected to the new Limerick City constituency in the UK Parliament. He appeared at Westminster in November 1801. He did not seek re-election.

For his support of the Union, Dublin Castle appointed him second counsel to the revenue board, with an annual salary of £1,200. Disappointed in not having been better remunerated for his Unionism, Grady supported opposition candidates in the general elections of 1812 and 1818. He died 8 September 1847.

== Notes ==
Parliament of Ireland
Preceded by John Prendergast Smyth; Edmund Pery	Member of Parliament for Limerick City; 1798–1801; With: Charles Vereker 1794–1801	Succeeded by Parliament of the United Kingdom
Parliament of the United Kingdom
Preceded by Parliament of Ireland	Member of Parliament for Limerick City; 1801–1802	Succeeded by Charles Vereker
