= John Stockton (disambiguation) =

John Stockton (born 1962) is an American retired basketball player.

John Stockton may also refer to:

- John Stockton (Michigan soldier) (1798–1878), American soldier, pioneer, and territorial legislator
- John P. Stockton (1826–1900), American politician from New Jersey
- Hust Stockton, full name John Houston "Hust" Stockton (1901–1967), American football player in the National Football League, grandfather of the basketball player

== See also ==
- Stockton (surname)
