= Sir John Hotham, 9th Baronet =

English baronet and Anglican clergyman

Sir John Hotham, Bt., D.D
- Bishop of Clogher
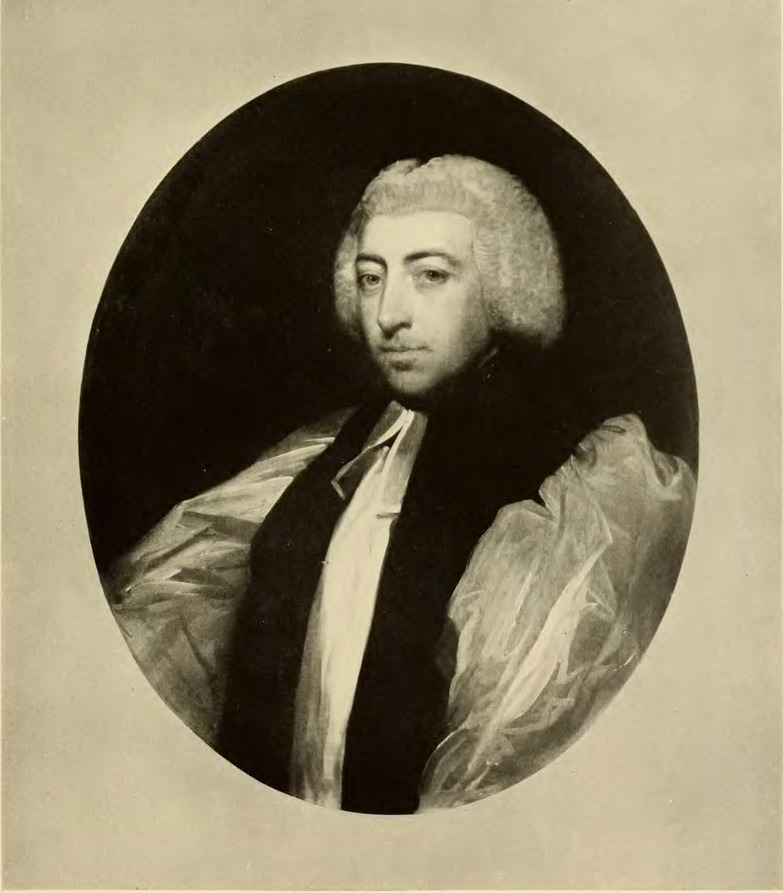
- portrait by Gilbert Stuart
- Church: Church of Ireland
- Diocese: Clogher
- Appointed: 17 May 1782
- Installed: 11 June 1782 (by proxy)
- Term ended: 3 November 1795
- Predecessor: John Garnett
- Successor: William Foster
- Previous posts: Vicar of St Leonard's, Shoreditch; Archdeacon of Middlesex; Bishop of Ossory

Orders
- Consecration: 14 November 1779 by Robert Fowler

Personal details
- Born: February or 16 March 1734
- Died: 3 November 1795 Bath, Somerset, England
- Buried: South Dalton, East Riding of Yorkshire, England
- Denomination: Anglican
- Parents: Sir Beaumont Hotham, 7th Baronet
- Spouse: Susanna Mackworth
- Education: Trinity College, Cambridge

Sir John Hotham, 9th Baronet, DD (1734–1795) was an English baronet and Anglican clergyman. He served in the Church of Ireland as the Bishop of Ossory from 1779 to 1782 and Bishop of Clogher from 1782 to 1795.

A member of the Hotham family, he was born in February or 16 March 1734, the son of Sir Beaumont Hotham, 7th Baronet. Following his education at Westminster School and Trinity College, Cambridge, he was the vicar of St Leonard's, Shoreditch and Archdeacon of Middlesex. He married Susanna Mackworth, daughter of Herbert Mackworth and Juliana Digby.

He was nominated Bishop of Ossory on 22 October 1779 and consecrated at St Patrick's Cathedral, Dublin on 14 November 1779; the principal consecrator was the Most Rev. Robert Fowler, Archbishop of Dublin, with the Rt. Rev. Charles Jackson, Bishop of Kildare and the Rt. Rev. Joseph Bourke, Bishop of Ferns and Leighlin serving as co-consecrators. Hotham was translated to the bishopric of Clogher by letters patent on 17 May 1782 and enthroned (by proxy) on 11 June 1782.

On the death of his brother Charles on 25 January 1794, John succeeded as the 9th Hotham Baronet of Scorborough.

He died in office of a paralytic stroke at Bath, Somerset on 3 November 1795, aged 61, and was buried at South Dalton, near Beverley in the East Riding of Yorkshire.

== Bibliography ==
- Cotton, Henry (1848). The Province of Leinster. Fasti Ecclesiae Hiberniae: The Succession of the Prelates and Members of the Cathedral Bodies of Ireland. Vol. 2. Dublin: Hodges and Smith.
- Cotton, Henry (1849). The Province of Ulster. Fasti Ecclesiae Hiberniae: The Succession of the Prelates and Members of the Cathedral Bodies of Ireland. Vol. 3. Dublin: Hodges and Smith.
- Cotton, Henry (1851). The Province of Munster. Fasti Ecclesiae Hiberniae: The Succession of the Prelates and Members of the Cathedral Bodies of Ireland. Vol. 1 (2nd ed.). Dublin: Hodges and Smith.
- Fryde, E. B.; Greenway, D. E.; Porter, S.; Roy, I., eds. (1986). Handbook of British Chronology (3rd, reprinted 2003 ed.). Cambridge: Cambridge University Press. ISBN 0-521-56350-X.
- Horn, J. M. (1969). Fasti Ecclesiae Anglicanae 1541–1857. Vol. 1: St. Paul's, London. British History Online.

Church of England titles
Preceded by Fifield Allen	Archdeacon of Middlesex; 1764–1780	Succeeded by George Jubb
Church of Ireland titles
Preceded by William Newcome	Bishop of Ossory; 1779–1782	Succeeded by William Beresford
Preceded by John Garnett	Bishop of Clogher; 1782–1795	Succeeded by William Foster
Baronetage of England
Preceded by Charles Hotham-Thompson	Baronet (of Scorborough); 1794–1795	Succeeded by Charles Hotham
