= Daggett, Indiana =

- Unincorporated community
- Location within Indiana Location within the United States
- Coordinates: 39°12′56″N 87°02′20″W
- Country: United States
- State: Indiana
- County: Owen
- Township: Jefferson
- Elevation: 640 ft (195 m)
- Time zone: UTC-5 (Eastern (EST))
  - Summer (DST): UTC-4 (EDT)
- ZIP code: 47427
- Area codes: 812, 930
- GNIS feature ID: 433281

Daggett is an unincorporated community in Jefferson Township, Owen County, in the U.S. state of Indiana.

== History ==
Daggett was laid out in 1880. The community was named for Charles Daggett, the owner of a saw mill which was the center of the town's industry.

A post office was established at Daggett in 1880, and remained in operation until it was discontinued in 1896.

== Geography ==
Daggett is located on State Road 157 about one mile south of Coal City, at 39°12′56″N 87°02′20″W.
