= Thomas Stockton =

Thomas Stockton may refer to:

- Thomas Stockton (politician) (1781–1846), American soldier and politician, governor of Delaware
- Thomas H. Stockton (1808–1868), chaplain of the United States House of Representatives
- Thomas Stockton (judge) (1609–1674), English-born judge in Ireland
- T.B.W. Stockton (Thomas Baylis Whitmarsh Stockton, 1805–1890), American army officer and engineer
