= Robert Fowler (archbishop of Dublin) =

Anglo-Irish clergyman

The Right Reverend and Right Honourable Robert Fowler PC (Ire), D.D.
- Archbishop of Dublin; Bishop of Glendalough; Primate of Ireland
- Church: Church of Ireland
- Diocese: Dublin and Glendalough
- Appointed: 8 January 1779
- In office: 1779–1801
- Predecessor: John Cradock
- Successor: Charles Agar
- Previous post: Bishop of Killaloe and Kilfenora (1771–1779)

Orders
- Ordination: 1764
- Consecration: 28 July 1771 by Arthur Smyth

Personal details
- Born: 23 December 1724 Skendleby, Lincolnshire, England
- Died: 10 October 1801 (aged 76) Takeley, Essex, England
- Buried: Holy Trinity Church, Takeley
- Denomination: Anglican
- Parents: George Fowler & Mary Hurst
- Spouse: Mildred Dealtry
- Children: 3
- Education: Trinity College, Cambridge

Robert Fowler (23 December 1724 – 10 October 1801) was an Anglo-Irish clergyman. He served as the Archbishop of Dublin in the Church of Ireland from 1779 until his death in 1801.

== Life ==
Robert Fowler was born on 23 December 1724, and baptized at Skendleby Thorpe, Lincolnshire, England. He was the third son of George and Mary Fowler (née Hurst) of Skendleby Thorpe. After an education at Westminster School, he was elected a King's Scholar in 1744. On 24 May of that year, he was admitted to Trinity College, Cambridge, where he received a Bachelor of Arts degree in 1747, a Master of Arts degree in 1751, and a Doctor of Divinity degree in 1764. He married Mildred, eldest daughter (and coheir of her brother, also William) of William Dealtry of Gainsborough, County Lincolnshire, on 29 October 1766. Together, they had one son and two daughters.

An appointment as Chaplain to King George II in 1756 led Robert Fowler to a seat as Dean and Prebendary of Westminster Abbey from 1765 to 1771. A prebend at Westminster was highly sought after by the ecclesiastical establishment. The value of the prebend helped to enrich the salaries of bishops, who retained their prebends at Westminster whilst in another office. Robert Fowler was nominated on 13 June and consecrated on 28 July 1771, Bishop of Killaloe and Kilfenora in Ireland. On 22 December 1778, during the administration of Lord Buckingham, he was translated to the archepiscopal see of Dublin. His letters patent were issued by King George III on 8 January 1779, and on the 13th of the same month he was consecrated and enthroned in Christ Church Cathedral, Dublin, as Archbishop of Dublin and Primate of Ireland. On 16 January, he was consecrated and enthroned at St. Patrick's Cathedral, Dublin. The elevation to the Archbishopric of Dublin in 1779 also led him to a seat on the Irish Privy Council. The Irish Privy Council was a private committee of King George III's closest advisors to give confidential advice on affairs of state. In 1783 Robert Fowler was appointed the position of Chancellor of the 'Order of St. Patrick'. The 'Most Illustrious Order of Saint Patrick', as it is formally known, is a British order of chivalry associated with Ireland and was created by King George III on 5 February 1783.

In William Domville Handcock's book, The History and Antiquities of Tallaght in the County of Dublin (published 1877), the writer recounts a brief detail of a Vestry meeting in 1783. During the Vestry meeting, it was proposed that a throne be erected, or a suitable pew enclosed, for the use of the Archbishop in Tallaght Church. However, Archbishop Fowler declined the honor, stating that one seat should not be more decorated than another in a parish church. This account would support why his parishioners and contemporaries thought him a kind, courteous and affable man—as he was also described in Samuel Burdy's The Life of Philip Skelton (published 1792).

Fowler opposed the evangelicals and banned two ordained clergy for preaching justification by faith. As a result, they founded the breakaway Kellyite sect, which lingered on into the 1850s. In 1782 he was one of 12 Spiritual Peers in the Irish House of Lords who opposed the Bill for the relief of Dissenters on the grounds that it would promote clandestine & improvident marriages. In 1789 he joined with 14 other peers in protest at the appointment of the Prince of Wales as Regent during the temporary illness of King George III. On the basis of these political activities, Fowler made his request to become a Temporal (hereditary) Peer. The government under William Pitt refused his request on the grounds that he had done no more than his duty as archbishop. Fowler was furious, and travelled to England to remonstrate with Pitt, to no avail.

It would seem from the evidence that in spite of Philip Skelton's commendation of Fowler's great regard for religion, his main interests were in family, gardens and with little reverence for antiquities. The garden of the Palace of Tallaght was brought to a high state of perfection. Sadly, in 1793, Fowler's wife died and was buried at Tallaght Church.

In March 1798, intelligence from informants among the United Irishmen caused the British Government to sweep up most of their leadership in Dublin. Martial law was imposed over most of the country, and its unrelenting force put the United Irish organization under severe pressure to act before it was too late. During the absence of the Archbishop in 1798, Tallaght Palace was attacked by armed men and various weapons were stolen. The Irish Rebellion was to follow, and these factors may have decided a prelate, who was already known as an absentee, to travel to England. In his justification and defence, it must be said that Robert Fowler was not alone in being an absentee prelate during the gradual clashes between the United Irish and British Government. As early as 1782, the Irish Patriot Party, led by Henry Grattan, pushed for greater enfranchisement. They used their newly powerful position to force the Crown to grant the landed Ascendancy self-rule and a more independent parliament. In 1793, parliament passed laws allowing Catholics with property to vote, but they could neither be elected nor appointed as state officials. In response, liberal elements among the ruling class were inspired by the example of the American Revolution (1776–1783) and the French Revolution (1789–1799), which had taken place in a Catholic country. They sought to form a common cause with the Catholic populace to achieve reform and greater autonomy from Britain. The Insurrection Act 1796 (36 Geo. 3. c. 20 (I)) was passed to suppress the growing number of meetings, distributed literature, and "disturbances of the public peace" by the United Irish. This Act did little to halt organization and growing sentiment for the United Irish movement or the uprisings which ultimately led to the Irish Rebellion of 1798. Within the next six years, however, the rebellion and residual pockets of resistance were vanquished by British forces.

Due to ill health, Archbishop Fowler lived the remaining two years of his life at Bassingbourne Hall in Takeley, Essex, England, a seat which he rented from Sir Peter Parker, 1st Baronet (who himself purchased the estate from Francis Bernard, 1st Earl of Bandon). Fowler lived to see the 'Union with Ireland Act' and the 'Act of Union' pass in 1800. He died on 10 October 1801, at Bassingbourne Hall, and was buried at Holy Trinity Church in Takeley on 19 October.

Archbishop Fowler's children were to fulfil his ambitions to become a member of the Peerage. Eldest daughter Mildred (who became Countess of Kilkenny) married in 1793 Edmund Butler, 12th Lord Viscount Mountgarret and 1st (and last) Earl of Kilkenny. Robert Fowler's 2nd daughter Frances married in 1795 Richard Bourke, Bishop of Waterford and Lismore and younger brother to the 4th Earl of Mayo; their son became the 5th Earl of Mayo when the 4th Earl died without issue. Robert Fowler's only son Robert was consecrated Bishop of Ossory in 1813, then in 1835 became the inaugural Bishop of Ossory, Ferns and Leighlin. He married in 1796 the Honorable Louisa Gardiner, eldest daughter of Luke Gardiner, 1st Viscount Mountjoy, and sister to Charles Gardiner, 1st Earl of Blessington.

Until fairly recently, the exact burial place of such a man of importance at Holy Trinity Church had presented something of a mystery, as there was no memorial, tomb, or tablet of any kind to him. The discovery of a vault filled in during the Victorian restoration has solved this mystery, and it is now known that Robert Fowler, Archbishop of Dublin, is buried under the Chancel (or Altar) of the Holy Trinity Church, Takeley.

Bassingbourne Hall, the great house built by William Towse circa 1580, and the last residence of Archbishop Fowler, was demolished in 1813 according to the will of the owner, Sir Peter Parker. The house demolished in 1988 to make way for the expansion of Stansted Airport was originally the Home Farm House of Bassingourne Hall and took on the name when that building was razed.

Church of Ireland titles
Preceded by John Cradock	Archbishop of Dublin; 1779–1801	Succeeded by The Viscount Somerton
