= Charles Feilding =

Anglo-Irish politician

Sir Charles Feilding

Member of the Privy Council of Ireland
- In office 1685–1722
- Monarch: James II of England

Member of Parliament for Limerick City
- In office 1692–1693

Member of Parliament for Duleek
- In office 1695–1699

Personal details
- Born: c. 1641
- Died: 24 April 1722 (aged 80–81)
- Spouse: Ursula Stockton (m. 1674)
- Children: 2
- Parents: George Feilding, 1st Earl of Desmond (father); Bridget Stanhope (mother)

Sir Charles Feilding (c. 1641 – 24 April 1722) was an Anglo-Irish politician.

Feilding was the son of George Feilding, 1st Earl of Desmond and Bridget Stanhope.

He was made a Knight Bachelor in 1673 having gained the rank of Colonel in the 1st Regiment of Foot Guards. He was appointed a member of the Privy Council of Ireland by James II of England in 1685. He was the Member of Parliament for Limerick City in the Irish House of Commons from 1692 to 1693. He then represented Duleek between 1695 and 1699.

He married Ursula Stockton, daughter of Sir Thomas Stockton, in 1674, by whom he had two daughters.

Parliament of Ireland
Preceded by Nicholas Arthur; Thomas Harold	Member of Parliament for Limerick City; 1692–1693; With: Joseph Coghlan	Succeeded by Joseph Coghlan; Joseph Williamson
Preceded by Sir Arthur Langford, Bt; Andrew Ram	Member of Parliament for Duleek; 1695–1699; With: Andrew Ram (1695–1698); Charles Wallis (1698–1699)	Succeeded by Robert Curtis; Charles Wallis
