= Thomas Pearce (British Army officer) =

British Army general (d. 1739)

Thomas Pearce, PC (c. 1670 – 1739) was an English army officer, a privy councillor and a member of parliament. During the War of the Spanish Succession he was deputy commander-in-chief in Portugal later serving in Gibraltar. He was appointed to Ireland in 1715, spending his last five years in Dublin where he died in 1739, General of his Majesty's Forces in Ireland.

== Family ==
Third and youngest son of Edward Pearce (1620 – 1683) of Parson's Green Fulham and his wife Mary (1635 – 1728), daughter of Dudley Carleton and his second wife Lucy Croft. Thomas was baptised 1 March 1669/1670 at St Mary in the Marsh, Norwich near his father's Whitlingham estate.

Pearce married Mary daughter of William Hewes of Wrexham and his wife Sarah daughter of Thomas Wayte, governor of Beeston Castle, Cheshire. They had three sons and two daughters, his daughter Ann married her first cousin, noted Irish architect Edward Lovett Pearce and son of Thomas's brother, General Edward Pearce.

His main Irish residence was at Altidore Castle in County Wicklow.

Pearce had good political links through close family in London and Dublin.

Major General Pearce's Regiment of Dragoons at disbanding 29 April 1713. includes brother and son

== Parliament ==
Represented Ludgershall, a parliamentary borough in Wiltshire, from 1703 to 1713 and the city of Limerick from 1727 until his death.

== Army ==
=== Portugal ===
Deputy commander-in-chief Portugal 1711 – 1713

Whitehall, 17 February 1713
Major General Pearce who commanded Her Majesty's Forces in Portugal, is returned hither; he has had the honour to kiss Her Majesty's Hand and was very graciously received.

=== Gibraltar ===
Hampton-Court, 26 August 1717
It is His Majesty's Pleasure, that all the Officers belonging to the Regiments of Foot now at Gibraltar, do immediately repair to their respective Posts, upon Pain of His Majesty's highest Displeasure, and particularly those of Major-General Pearce's Regiment, except such as have Leave from His Majesty to the contrary.

=== Ireland ===
Military Governor of the castle and turbulent city of Limerick 1715 –

1727 is back in Ireland at

Limerick 7 February 1727
This Day we received an account from Dublin, that the Court of King's Bench has allowed an information to be filed against our Governor, for assuming the Power and Office of Mayor of this City; which news has caused inexpressible Joy among his Majesty's faithful Subjects here.

Dublin 14 February 1727
Yesterday our Artillery were all carefully viewed by the Gunners; and such as were any way defective were taken Care of; but only one cannon was found unfit for Service. Last Saturday the Court of King's Bench ordered Informations to be filed against James Robinson, Robert Twigg, John Vincent, and John Higgins, of Limerick, Aldermen, for exercising the Offices of Justices of the Peace in that City, not being duly elected. These four Aldermen took upon them the Offices of Justices since the Time Major General Pearce, Governor of the Garrison, first assumed the Civil Magistracy of that City. The Rules for Informations against the Sheriffs &c are suspended until those against the Governor and the aforesaid Aldermen are determined, which the Prosecutors, on Behalf of the King are resolved to Speed to Trial with all possible Expedition.

Dublin, 21 August 1737
This day came on before their Excellencies the Lords Justices; and the Right Hon. the Privy Council, the Election for Magistrates to serve for the ensuing Year for the City of Limerick, and after a long Debate, for near 13 Hours, the Lords of the Council were pleased to approve of John Vincent, Esq; for Mayor, Arthur Blennerhasset, Esq., for Recorder. George Bose and Richard Chester, Gentlemen, for Sheriffs, who were certified to their Excellencies and Lordships as duly elected by the Hon. Lieutenant General Pearce, present Mayor of Limerick, under the Common Seal of the City.
The Debate was occasioned by the Petition of George Roche, Toxteth Roche, Richard Roche Clerk, Francis Roche, and Rchard Roche, Jun. and several other Brothers and Nephews of that Family who suggested that Military Force, and other undue Practices were made use of by the Mayor at the Election, to terrify the Voters.
But the allegations appear to be frivolous and groundless, and that the Persons returned by the General were elected by a great Majority, and were Men of undoubted and known Loyalty, and it appearing likewise that a certain Family had embezzled the Corporation Revenues, and had shared them amongst themselves for many Years past, the Right Hon. the Privy Council were pleased to reject the Petition and to approve of the aforesaid Persons to be Magistrates. This approbation will occasion an universal Joy in the Citizens, who for a long season have laboured under heavy Oppressions from the Tyrannical Government of a certain Family, till rescued by the present Mayor.

Dublin, 9 October 1727
We hear from Limerick, that the Election for Members to serve in the ensuing Parliament for that City came on the 3rd Instant; The Candidates were the Hon. Lieut. General Pearce, Hen. Ingoldsby, Esq; and Geo Roche, Esq; all upon their single Interests; the two former, upon closing the Books, were declared duly elected. The Poll stood thus: For Mr Pearce 362, for Mr Ingoldsby 316, for Mr Roche 147.

London 21 March 1728
Orders sent for Pearce's Foot to embark at Gibraltar for Great Britain

Pearces Egerton's and Bisset's have arrived at Cork from Gibraltar where P's and E's have been for 15 years and B's upwards of 10

ON THE IRISH ESTABLISHMENT

on 19 March said to be appointed to command the forces on the Irish Establishment in the absence of Lord Shannon

29 March 1737 His Majesty has been pleased to appoint Lieutenant General Thomas Pearce to be Governor of Londonderry and Culmore Port in Ireland.

=== Regiments and ranks ===
- 1689 Ensign

==== Coldstream Guards ====
- 1692 Captain

==== Foot Guards ====
- 1702 Major
- 1703 Colonel of Foot

==== Pearce's Foot ====
- 5 February 1704 to September 1732 colonel, 5th Regiment of Foot later the Royal Regiment of Fusiliers

==== Pearce's Horse ====
1732-1739 colonel, 5th Regiment of Horse later the 4th/7th Royal Dragoon Guards

Based in Dublin from July 1734

=== General officer ===
- 1707 Brigadier General
- 1710 Major General
- 1727 Lieutenant General

I R E L A N D
Dublin, 17 May 1738.
Yesterday Col. Hamilton's Regiment of Dragoons, and Brigadier Dormer's, Col. Cornwallis's and Col. Bragg's Regiments of Foot, were reviewed in the Deer-Park by Lieutenant General Thomas Pearce, and all went through their Exercises with the greatest Dexterity and Exactness.

Dublin, 2 September 1738
On Tuesday last the Right Honourable Lieutenant General Thomas Pearce reviewed in his Majesty's Phoenix Park, Brigadier Legonier's Regiment of Horse, and Colonels Wentworth, Handasyde, and Paget's Regiments of Foot, which are on Duty in our Barracks. They performed all their Exercises and Firings with the utmost Exactness and Dexterity, to the entire Satisfaction of the General, and a numerous Company of Spectators of all Ranks.

Dublin, January 1739
Letters from Dublin mention,
that on Tuesday last died suddenly at his house at Stephen's Green, the Right Hon. Thomas Pearce, Esq; Lieutenant-General of his Majesty's Land Forces in that Kingdom, Colonel of a Regiment of Horse, and Member of Parliament and Governor of the City of Limerick.

Dublin, 23 Jan. 1739
The Right honourable Lieutenant-General Thomas Pearce, Esq; General of his Majesty's Forces in Ireland, was carried to Christ-Church last Saturday, and interred with great Military Honour and Solemnity. The Pall-Bearers were the Right Hon. the Lord Viscount Molesworth; the Right Hon. the Lord Tullamore; the Hon. General Napier; the Hon. General Parker; Colonel Butler, Adjutant-General; and the Right Hon. the Lord Sempill.
On Saturday Night last, past Ten of the Clock, the Corpse of the Right Hon. the Lieutenant General Thomas Pearce was taken out of the Vault in Christ-Church, where it was deposited, and carried in an Hearse, accompanied by a Mourning Coach, to Donneybrooke Church where it was interred.

Parliament of Great Britain
| Preceded by Robert Bruce; John Richmond Webb | Member of Parliament for Ludgershall; 1710–1713; With: John Richmond Webb | Succeeded by Robert Ferne; John Richmond Webb |
Parliament of Ireland
| Preceded by William Foord; George Roche | Member of Parliament for Limerick City; 1727–1731; With: Henry Ingoldsby 1727–1731; Charles Smyth 1731–1741 | Succeeded by William Wilson; Charles Smyth |
Military offices
| Preceded by The Lord Fairfax of Cameron | Colonel of Pearce's Regiment of Foot; 1704–1732 | Succeeded by Sir John Cope |
| Preceded by Owen Wynne | Colonel of Pearce's Regiment of Horse; 1732–1739 | Succeeded by The Lord Tyrawley |
| Preceded by Owen Wynne | Governor of Londonderry; 1737–1739 | Succeeded by Phineas Bowles |
