= William Carmichael (bishop) =

Archbishop of Dublin, Ireland (1765)

The Right Reverend and Right Honourable William Carmichael PC (Ire), LL.D.
- Archbishop of Dublin; Bishop of Glendalough; Primate of Ireland
- Church: Church of Ireland
- Diocese: Dublin and Glendalough
- Appointed: 12 June 1765
- In office: 1765
- Predecessor: Charles Cobbe
- Successor: Arthur Smyth
- Previous posts: Bishop of Clonfert and Kilmacduagh (1753-1758); Bishop of Ferns and Leighlin (1758); Bishop of Meath (1758-1765)

Orders
- Consecration: 1 April 1753 by Charles Cobbe

Personal details
- Born: 1702 Scotland
- Died: 15 December 1765 (aged 62–63) Bath, Somerset, England
- Denomination: Anglican
- Parents: James Carmichael

William Carmichael (1702–1765) was Archbishop of Dublin for a brief period in 1765.

He was the son of the second Earl of Hyndford.

He had previously been Archdeacon of Buckingham (1742–1753), Bishop of Clonfert and Kilmacduagh (1753–1758), Ferns and Leighlin (1758) and Meath (1758–1765).

He died on 15 December 1765.

Church of England titles
Preceded by Nicholas Clagett	Archdeacon of Buckingham; 1742–1753	Succeeded by John Taylor
Church of Ireland titles
Preceded by Arthur Smyth	Bishop of Clonfert and Kilmacduagh; 1753–1758	Succeeded by William Gore
Preceded by John Garnet	Bishop of Ferns and Leighlin; April 1758–June 1758	Succeeded by Thomas Salmon
Preceded by Henry Maule	Bishop of Meath; 1758–1765	Succeeded by Richard Pococke
Preceded by Charles Cobbe	Archbishop of Dublin; May 1765–December 1765	Succeeded by Arthur Smyth
