= Stockton (surname) =

Stockton is an English surname. Notable people with the surname include:

- Abbye "Pudgy" Stockton (1917–2006), American professional strongwoman
- Annis Stockton (1736–1801), American poet
- Betsey Stockton (1798–1865), African American educator and missionary
- Charles Stockton (1845–1924), American admiral and international law expert
- Cole Stockton (both 1994), English professional footballer
- Dave Stockton (born 1941), American golfer
- Dave Stockton Jr. (born 1968), American golfer
- Dean Stockton, English street artist known as D*Face
- Dick Stockton (born 1942), American sportscaster
- Dick Stockton (tennis) (born 1951), American tennis player and coach
- Doris Stockton (1924–2018), American mathematician
- Duston Stockton, Stop the Steal organizer
- Frank R. Stockton (1834–1902), American writer and humorist (Louise's brother)
- Gunner Stockton (born 2004), American football player
- A family of American sportspeople:
  - Hust Stockton (1901–1967), football player
  - John Stockton (born 1962), Hust's grandson, basketball player
  - Michael Stockton (born 1989), John's son; basketball player
  - David Stockton (born 1991), John's son; basketball player
  - Laura Stockton (born c. 1997), John's daughter; basketball player
- Jack Stockton, American politician
- John Stockton (Michigan soldier) (1798–1878) American territorial legislator
- John P. Stockton (1826–1900), American politician
- Louise Stockton (1838–1914), American author, journalist, club organizer (Frank's sister)
- Morris Stockton (1873–1964), American author and composer; pseudonym for Anice Potter Terhune
- Richard Stockton (1730–1781), American lawyer, signer of the Declaration of Independence
- Richard Stockton (1764–1828), American politician
- Robert F. Stockton (1795–1866), American naval officer
- Thomas Stockton (politician) (1781–1846), American soldier and politician
- Thomas Stockton (judge) (1609–1674), English-born judge who held office in seventeenth-century Ireland
- William Tennent Stockton (1812–1869), American soldier and politician from Florida
- Layla Stockton, a fictional character from 2012 video game Hitman Absolution.

== See also ==
- Stockton (disambiguation)
