= Fifield Allen =

Archdeacon of Middlesex from 1741 to 1764

Fifield Allen, DD(1700–1764) was Archdeacon of Middlesex from 6 May 1741 until his death on 26 April 1764.

Allen was born in Oxford and educated at Christ Church, Oxford. He was Rector of Chigwell, a Prebend of St Pancras in St Paul's Cathedral and Sub-Dean of the Chapel Royal.

== Notes ==
Church of England titles
Preceded by Daniel Waterland	Archdeacon of Middlesex; 1741–1764	Succeeded by John Hotham
