= Justice Stockton =

Justice Stockton may refer to:

- Lacon D. Stockton (1814–1860), justice of the Iowa Supreme Court
- Richard Stockton (Continental Congressman) (1730–1781), chief justice of the New Jersey Supreme Court
- Richard Stockton (Mississippi politician) (c. 1792–1827), associate justice of the Supreme Court of Mississippi
- Thomas Stockton (judge) (1609–1674), English-born judge who held office in seventeenth-century Ireland
