= Edmund Pery, 1st Viscount Pery =

Anglo-Irish politician

The Right Honourable The Viscount Pery PC
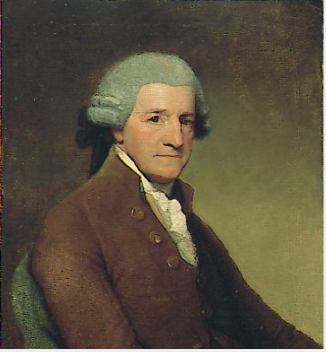
- Portrait by Gilbert Stuart, c. 1790

Speaker of the Irish House of Commons
- In office 1771–1785
- Monarch: George III
- Preceded by: John Ponsonby
- Succeeded by: John Foster

Personal details
- Born: 8 April 1719 Limerick, Ireland
- Died: 24 February 1806 (aged 86) Park Street, Mayfair, England
- Party: Patriot
- Spouse(s): (1) Patricia Martin (m.1756) (2) Hon. Elizabeth Vesey (m.1762)

Edmund Sexton Pery, 1st Viscount Pery (Note: His first name is also recorded as being spelt Edmond and his middle name as Sexten.) (8 April 1719 – 24 February 1806) was an Anglo-Irish politician who served as the penultimate Speaker of the Irish House of Commons between 1771 and 1785. He was one of the most powerful and prominent political figures in Ireland during the second half of the 18th century. As an Irish Patriot, he was a leading voice for the legislative independence of the Parliament of Ireland from the British parliament at Westminster, and opposed the Acts of Union 1800. Away from politics, he was instrumental in the development of his home city of Limerick.

== Early life ==
He was born in Limerick, into one of the city's most politically influential families, the elder son of the Rev. Stackpole Pery and Jane (née Twigge). His maternal grandfather was William Twigg, Archdeacon of Limerick. His younger brother was the leading Church of Ireland clergyman, William Pery, who was ennobled as Baron Glentworth in 1790. His younger sister was Lucy Hartstonge, the founder of what is now St John's Hospital.

Pery was educated at Trinity College Dublin, before training in law at the Middle Temple in London from 1739. He was called to the Bar of Ireland in 1745. As a barrister, he quickly became well regarded in the legal profession and was noted for his careful and measured delivery during court proceedings.

== Parliamentary career ==
Despite his success in law, Pery decided to pursue a career in politics and became a member of the Irish House of Commons for the Wicklow constituency in 1751. On the dissolution of the house following the death of George II, Pery was elected for the constituency of Limerick City and served from 1761 until 1785, becoming Speaker of the House in 1771 in succession to John Ponsonby. He had the distinction of being elected to the chair twice more, in 1776 and 1783. Upon becoming Speaker, he was made a member of the Privy Council of Ireland. In 1783, he stood also for Dungannon, however chose to sit for Limerick City.

Pery took a prominent stand on all major issues debated by the House of Commons. He rose to prominence in 1756 by opposing the usual address of thanks to the lord lieutenant, the Duke of Devonshire. He was a leading voice in the Irish Patriot movement, until he became eclipsed by his contemporary, Henry Flood. Despite this, Pery was considered one of the most powerful politicians in Ireland in his time, leading a faction which included his nephew, Edmund Pery, and his relatives by marriage, the Hartstonges. Over the course of his career, he moved from a position of support for the Dublin Castle administration to one of determined opposition, although during the 1760s his opposition to the government became less rigid.

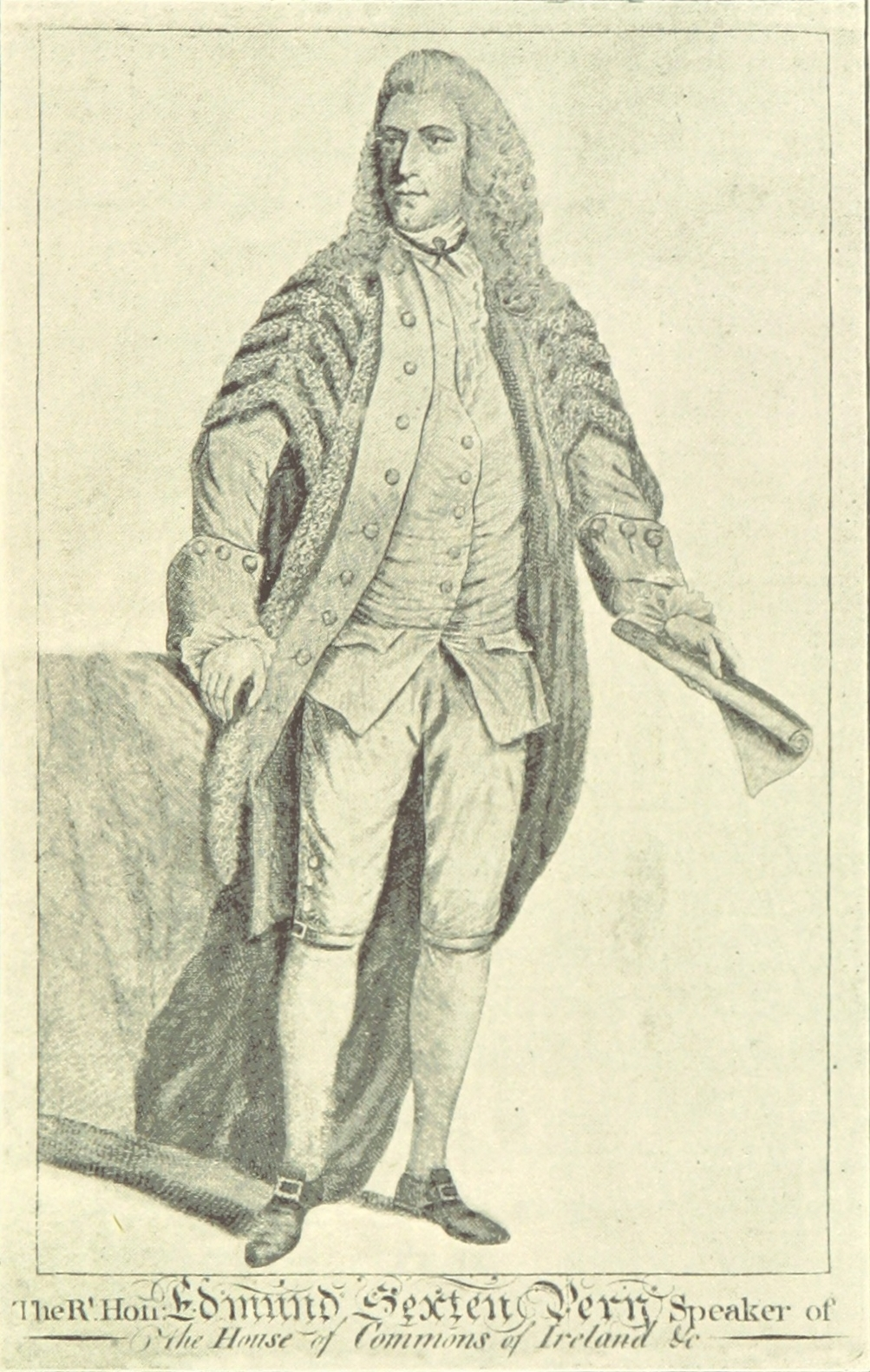
Pery depicted in his formal dress as Speaker of the Irish House of Commons

As Speaker, he was noted for his quiet and dignified manner and hailed by most MPs as a champion of the Commons, defending the strict impartiality of his office. He spoke with brevity and his decisions were never questioned. Henry Grattan described Pery as "one of the most honest men in existence". In 1772, Pery was lauded by Edmund Burke for his leadership from the chair during a debate on revenue commissioners which effected the privileges of the commons of Ireland. In 1782, Pery had a leading role in demands for Irish legislative independence, which prompted the Duke of Portland to describe Pery as "the hollowest, most cunning, intriguing and hitherto successful knave in the kingdom".

In 1785, citing ill-health, he resigned as Speaker and was granted a pension £3,000 per year by George III. Following his resignation, he was created Viscount Pery, of Newtown Pery, near the City of Limerick, in the Peerage of Ireland, entitling him to a seat in the Irish House of Lords. He rarely spoke in the Lords, but in 1799 he contributed to a debate to oppose the proposed legislative union with Great Britain. On 20 January 1799, Pery hosted opponents of the union at his Dublin townhouse, but his influence over the ensuing debate in parliament was limited. Nonetheless, he voted against the union bill.

== Role in the development of Limerick ==
Pery is also noted for his part in the history of the architecture of Limerick and he displayed great interest in the prosperity of his native city. In 1765, he commissioned the engineer Davis Ducart to design a town plan for land that Pery owned on the southern edge of the existing city, which led to the construction of the Georgian area of the city later known eponymously as Newtown Pery. Pery also instructed that the old city walls should be levelled, new roads laid, and a new bridge and spacious quays be built. He was commemorated in the naming of Pery Square.

== Marriages and issue ==
Pery married Patricia Martin of Dublin in 1756, who died a year later, and secondly in 1762 Elizabeth Vesey, daughter of John Vesey, 1st Baron Knapton and Elizabeth Brownlow. He and Elizabeth had two daughters:

- Hon. Diana Pery, who married her cousin Thomas Knox, 1st Earl of Ranfurly.
- Hon. Frances Pery, who married Nicolson Calvert, MP for Hertfordshire.

== Later life and death ==
In retirement, Pery lived mostly at his estate in England and in his London townhouse. Pery died on 24 February 1806 at his home on Park Street, Mayfair, London, and was buried in the Calvert family vault at Furneux Pelham in Hertfordshire. As he had no male heirs, his title became extinct on his death, although he was succeeded in his estates (valued at £8,000 per year) by his nephew, Edmund. Edmund was created Earl of Limerick in 1803 as a result of his support for the Act of Union.

== Notes ==
Parliament of Ireland
Preceded by Thomas Theaker; James Whitshed	Member of Parliament for Wicklow; 1751–1761; With: James Whitshed	Succeeded by William Tighe; William Whitshed
Preceded by Richard Maunsell; Charles Smyth	Member of Parliament for Limerick City; 1761–1785; With: Hugh Dillon Massy 1761; Charles Smyth 1761–1776; Thomas Smyth 1776–1785	Succeeded by John Prendergast Smyth; Thomas Smyth
Preceded by Charles O'Hara; William Eden	Member of Parliament for Dungannon; 1783; With: Hon. Thomas Knox	Succeeded by Lorenzo Moore; Hon. Thomas Knox
Political offices
Preceded by John Ponsonby	Speaker of the Irish House of Commons; 1771–1785	Succeeded by John Foster
Peerage of Ireland
New creation	Viscount Pery; 1785–1806	Extinct
