= George Smyth (lawyer) =

Irish lawyer

George Smyth (1705 – 15 February 1772) was an Irish lawyer and judge.

He was the son of Thomas Smyth, Bishop of Limerick, and Dorothea Burgh (daughter of Ulysses Burgh, Dean of Emly and later Bishop of Ardagh, and Mary Kingsmill). His brothers included Charles Smyth, MP for Limerick, and Arthur Smyth, Archbishop of Dublin.

He was educated at a local school in Limerick and at the University of Dublin, which he entered in 1723, graduating in 1727. He entered the Middle Temple in 1728. He was called to the Bar in 1734, and became King's Counsel in 1758. He was Recorder of Limerick. He was appointed Chairman of the Court of Quarter Sessions for County Dublin in 1759. In 1763 he presided over the celebrated inquiry into the mental capacity of Nicholas Hume-Loftus, 2nd Earl of Ely. He was his brother's Seneschal in the See of Dublin from 1765.

He represented Blessington in the Irish House of Commons from 1759 to 1761.He failed to hold the seat in 1761, but regained it at the next election, and held it until he was raised to the bench as a Puisne Baron of the Court of Exchequer (Ireland) on 25 November 1768. On 13 December 1771 he was appointed one of the Commissioners of Accounts for Ireland, but died two months later at Bath. He was buried in Bath Abbey.

He was married on 4 August 1739 in St Mary's Church, Mary Street, Dublin, to Catherine Rawson, daughter of Philip Rawson of Limerick. The couple had four children. Thomas Smyth (Archdeacon of Lismore) was one of their sons. Catherine died in 1770.
