= Jefferson Township, Owen County, Indiana =

Jefferson Township
- Township
- Location in Owen County
- Coordinates: 39°12′34″N 86°58′48″W
- Country: United States
- State: Indiana
- County: Owen

Government
  - Type: Indiana township

Area
  - Total: 47.94 sq mi (124.2 km^{2})
  - Land: 47.8 sq mi (124 km^{2})
  - Water: 0.13 sq mi (0.34 km^{2}) 0.27%
- Elevation: 522 ft (159 m)

Population (2020)
  - Total: 998
  - Density: 20.9/sq mi (8.06/km^{2})
- ZIP codes: 47427, 47431, 47471
- GNIS feature ID: 453494

Jefferson Township is one of thirteen townships in Owen County, Indiana, United States. As of the 2020 census, its population was 998 (down from 1,129 at 2010) and it contained 478 housing units.

== History ==
Jefferson Township was organized in 1828. It was named for Thomas Jefferson, third President of the United States.

== Geography ==
According to the 2010 census, the township has a total area of 47.94 square miles (124.2 km^{2}), of which 47.8 square miles (124 km^{2}) (or 99.71%) is land and 0.13 square miles (0.34 km^{2}) (or 0.27%) is water.

=== Unincorporated towns ===
- Arney at 39.2186546°N 86.9316754°W
- Coal City at 39.2303203°N 87.0458444°W
- Daggett at 39.2155983°N 87.0388998°W
- Stockton at 39.2389314°N 87.0222329°W

(This list is based on USGS data and may include former settlements.)

=== Cemeteries ===
The township contains these six cemeteries: Bush, Fiscus, Little John, Neihart, Shouse and Winters.

=== Major highways ===
- U.S. Route 231
- Indiana State Road 67

=== Airports and landing strips ===
- Von Sloughs Airport

== School districts ==
- Spencer-Owen Community Schools

== Political districts ==
- State House District 46
- State Senate District 39
