= Edmund Pery, 1st Earl of Limerick =

Irish peer and politician

The Right Honourable The Earl of Limerick PC
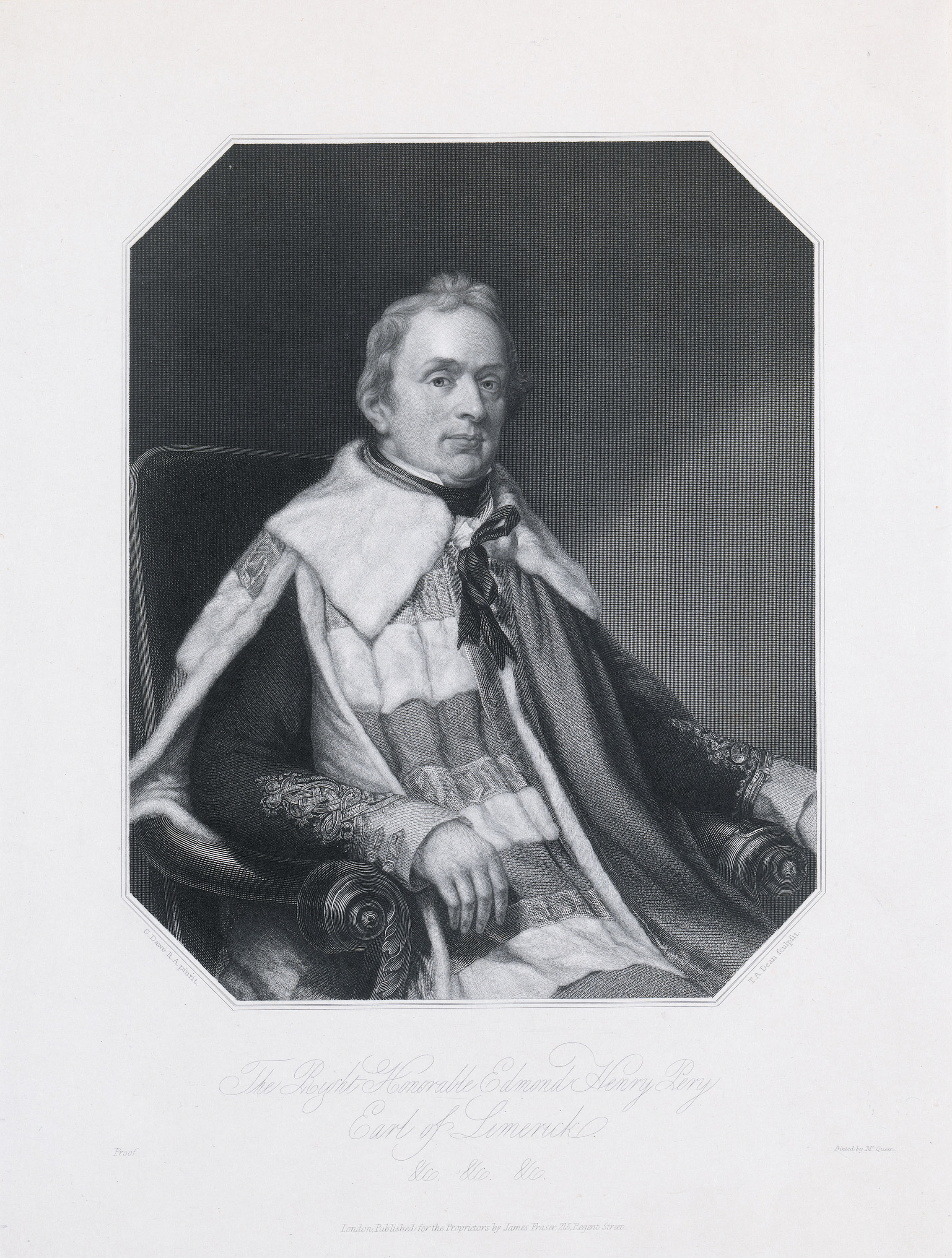
- An engraving of Edmund Pery, 1st Earl of Limerick after a portrait by George Dawe
- Born: 8 January 1758
- Died: 7 December 1844 (aged 86); South Hill Park, Berkshire, England
- Resting place: St Mary's Cathedral, Limerick
- Spouse: Mary Alice Ormsby (m. 1783)
- Children: 10
- Father: Lord Glentworth
- Relatives: Viscount Pery (uncle)

Edmund Henry Pery, 1st Earl of Limerick PC (8 January 1758 – 7 December 1844), styled Lord Glentworth between 1794 and 1800, and then Viscount Limerick until 1803, was an Irish peer and politician who was a prominent supporter of the Acts of Union 1800. He was also noted for his strong anti-Catholic opinions.

== Early life ==
Pery was the only son of William Pery, 1st Baron Glentworth and his first wife, Jane (née Walcott), daughter of John Minchin Walcott. He was the nephew and heir of Edmund Pery, 1st Viscount Pery. Pery was educated by private tutor followed by Trinity College Dublin, although he left university without taking a degree. In 1775 he entered Lincoln's Inn to train in law, before undertaking the Grand Tour. While travelling in France, he was presented at the court of Louis XVI. In 1783 he became a colonel in the Irish Volunteers militia.

== Political career ==
Pery was elected to the Irish House of Commons as the Member of Parliament for Limerick in 1786. In parliament he was a loyal supporter of the Dublin Castle administration. Pery was never widely respected in the Commons and was described by Jonah Barrington as being "always crafty, sometimes impetuous, and frequently efficient" in his political life.

In 1794, Pery inherited his father's barony and took his seat in the Irish House of Lords. His loyalty to the government was rewarded with a number of sinecure offices, including being appointed Keeper of the Signet and Privy Seal of Ireland between 1795 and 1797. Pery subsequently held the office of Clerk of the Crown and Hanaper of Ireland between 1797 and 1806. In the House of Lords, he took a leading stand in advocating the proposed Act of Union 1800, and following passage of the act he was created Viscount Limerick of the City of Limerick in recognition of his support. He became an Irish representative peer, sitting in the British House of Lords between 1801 and 1844.

Following the Act of Union 1800, he became an Irish representative peer, sitting in the House of Lords between 1801 and 1844. He was created Earl of Limerick in the Peerage of Ireland on 1 January 1803, in recognition of his vocal and persistent support for the Union. He did not take a prominent role in politics thereafter, but spoke consistently against Roman Catholic relief bills, and occasionally on other Irish issues in which opposed "every policy that savoured of O’Connellism". In 1806 he succeeded to his uncle's estates, valued at £8,000 per year. He was created Baron Foxford of Stackpole Court in the Peerage of the United Kingdom on 11 August 1815, giving him and his descendants a permanent seat in the House of Lords until the passing of the House of Lords Act 1999.

During the later years of his life he lived at South Hill Park, Berkshire, where he died in 1844. He was buried in the family vault in St Mary's Cathedral, Limerick; his unpopularity in Limerick led to violent protests during his funeral. Nonetheless, the Earl left the city the sum of £500 in his will for local charities.

== Marriage and issue ==
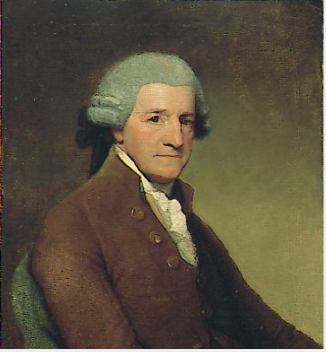
Pery was the heir of his influential uncle, Edmund Sexton Pery

He married Mary Alice, the daughter of Henry Ormsby of County Mayo, by his wife Mary Hartstonge, in 1783. Mary Alice was the heiress of her uncle, Sir Henry Hartstonge, 3rd Baronet, who left her substantial property in the south of Ireland. She died in 1850. The couple had three sons and seven daughters:

- Lady Louisa Pery (died 6 August 1852), married Sir Peter van Notten-Pole, 3rd Baronet.
- Lady Theodosia Pery (died December 1839), married the Whig politician and Chancellor of the Exchequer, Lord Monteagle of Brandon.
- Edmond Cecil Pery (c.1786 – 10 May 1793), predeceased his father.
- Lady Lucy Pery (born c.1788), married Rowland Standish.
- Henry Hartstonge Pery, Viscount Glentworth (26 May 1789 – 7 August 1834), married Annabella Edwards, predeceased his father.
- Lady Frances Selina Pery (30 July 1795 – 11 June 1855), married Sir Henry Calder, 5th Baronet.
- Hon. Edmund Sexton Pery (7 February 1797 – 31 December 1860), married Hon. Elizabeth Charlotte Cokayne, granddaughter of Charles Cokayne, 5th Viscount Cullen.
- Lady Caroline Alicia Diana Pery (1803 – 11 December 1890), married George Lake Russell, daughter of Sir Henry Russell, 1st Baronet.

Lord Limerick's eldest son and heir, Henry, Viscount Glentworth, had predeceased him in 1834, and thus Limerick was succeeded in his titles by Henry's eldest son, William.

Parliament of Ireland
Preceded by John Prendergast Smyth; Thomas Smyth	Member of Parliament for Limerick City; 1786–1794; With: John Prendergast Smyth	Succeeded by John Prendergast Smyth; Charles Vereker
Political offices
New post	Representative peer for Ireland; 1800–1844	Succeeded by The Earl of Rosse
Peerage of Ireland
New creation	Earl of Limerick; 1803–1844	Succeeded by William Pery
New creation	Viscount Limerick; 1800–1844	Succeeded by William Pery
Preceded by William Pery	Baron Glentworth; 1794–1844	Succeeded by William Pery
Peerage of the United Kingdom
New creation	Baron Foxford; 1815–1844	Succeeded by William Pery
