= Stockton Airport =

Stockton Airport may refer to:

- Stockton Metropolitan Airport in Stockton, California, United States (FAA: SCK)
- Stockton Municipal Airport (Kansas) in Stockton, Kansas, United States (FAA: 0S2)
- Stockton Municipal Airport (Missouri) in Stockton, Missouri, United States (FAA: MO3)
