= Arthur Smyth =

Irish archbishop

The Right Reverend and Right Honourable Arthur Smyth PC (Ire), D.D.
- Archbishop of Dublin; Bishop of Glendalough; Primate of Ireland
- Church: Church of Ireland
- Diocese: Dublin and Glendalough
- Appointed: 14 April 1766
- In office: 1766-1771
- Predecessor: William Carmichael
- Successor: John Cradock
- Previous posts: Bishop of Clonfert and Kilmacduagh (1752-1753); Bishop of Down and Connor (1753-1765); Bishop of Meath (1765-1766)

Orders
- Consecration: 5 April 1752 by John Ryder

Personal details
- Born: 19 February 1706 Limerick, County Limerick, Ireland
- Died: 14 December 1771 (aged 65) Dublin, County Dublin, Kingdom of Ireland
- Buried: St Patrick's Cathedral, Dublin
- Denomination: Anglican
- Parents: Thomas Smyth & Dorothea Burgh
- Spouse: Elizabeth Bonfoy

Arthur Smyth (19 February 1706 – 14 December 1771) was Archbishop of Dublin from 1766 until his death in 1771.

== Family ==
Smyth was the son of Thomas Smyth, Bishop of Limerick, and Dorothea Burgh (daughter of Ulysses Burgh, Bishop of Ardagh). His brothers included Charles Smyth, MP for Limerick, and the lawyer George Smyth.

== Career ==
Smyth studied at Trinity College, Dublin, and completed his studies in Oxford. He was Dean of Raphoe from 1742 until 1744, then Dean of Derry until 1752. He was then raised to the episcopate as Bishop of Clonfert and Kilmacduagh (1752), Down and Connor (1753) and Meath (1765), prior to his nomination as Archbishop of Dublin. In 1767 he was made a member of the Privy Council of Ireland. He was the first Irish-born Archbishop of Dublin for many years. He was not widely seen as a very spiritual man: critics said that his main interest was the advancement of the careers of his numerous relatives.

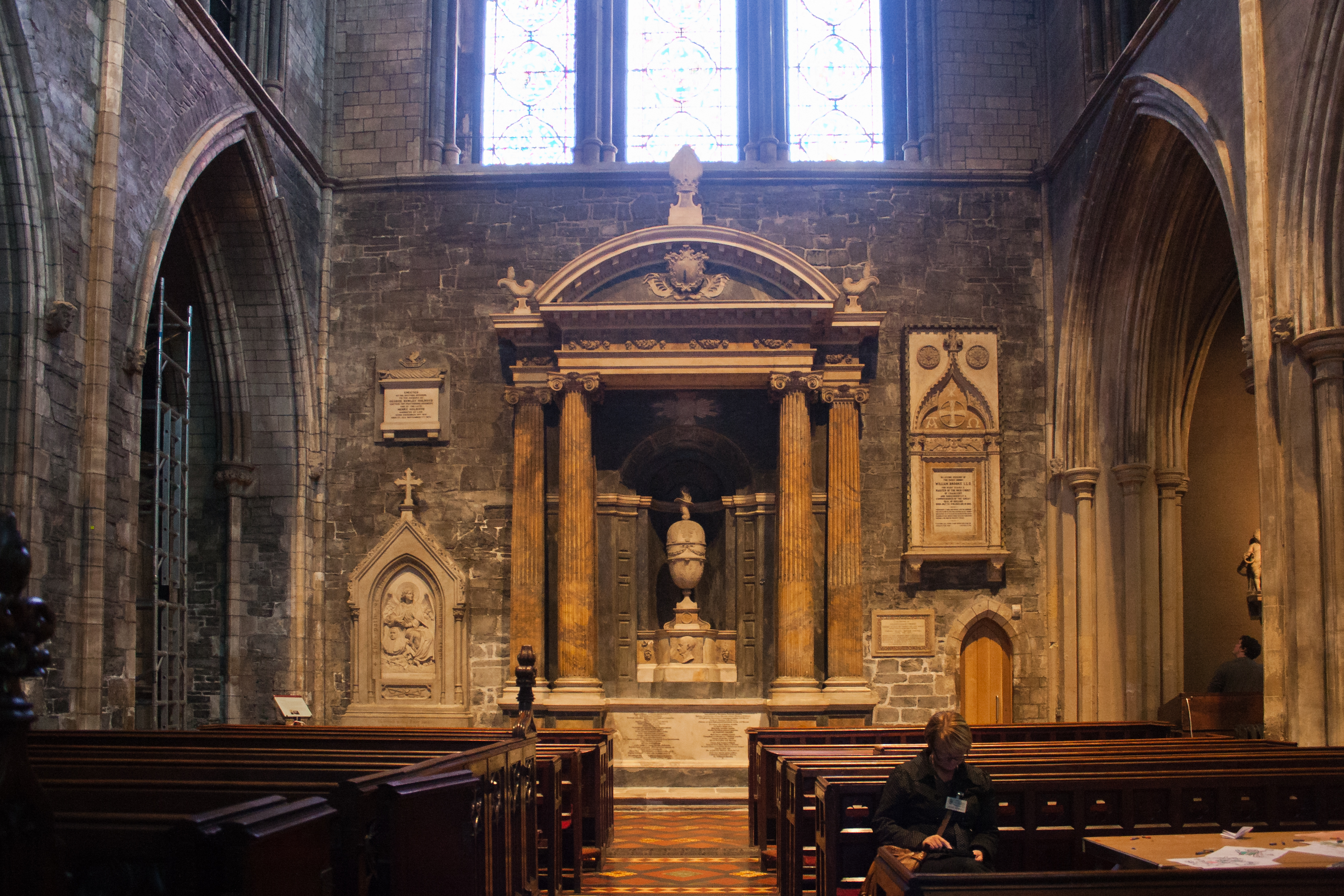
Monument dedicated to Arthur Smyth in the south transept of St. Patrick's Cathedral

Church of Ireland titles
Preceded by Robert Downes	Dean of Derry; 1744–1752	Succeeded by Philip Sydney Smyth
Preceded by John Whitcomb	Bishop of Clonfert and Kilmacduagh; 1752–1753	Succeeded by William Carmichael
Preceded by Robert Downes	Bishop of Down and Connor; 1753–1765	Succeeded by James Traill
Preceded by Richard Pococke	Bishop of Meath; 1765–1766	Succeeded by Henry Maxwell
Preceded by William Carmichael	Archbishop of Dublin; 1766–1771	Succeeded by John Cradock
