= Coal City, Indiana =

- Unincorporated community
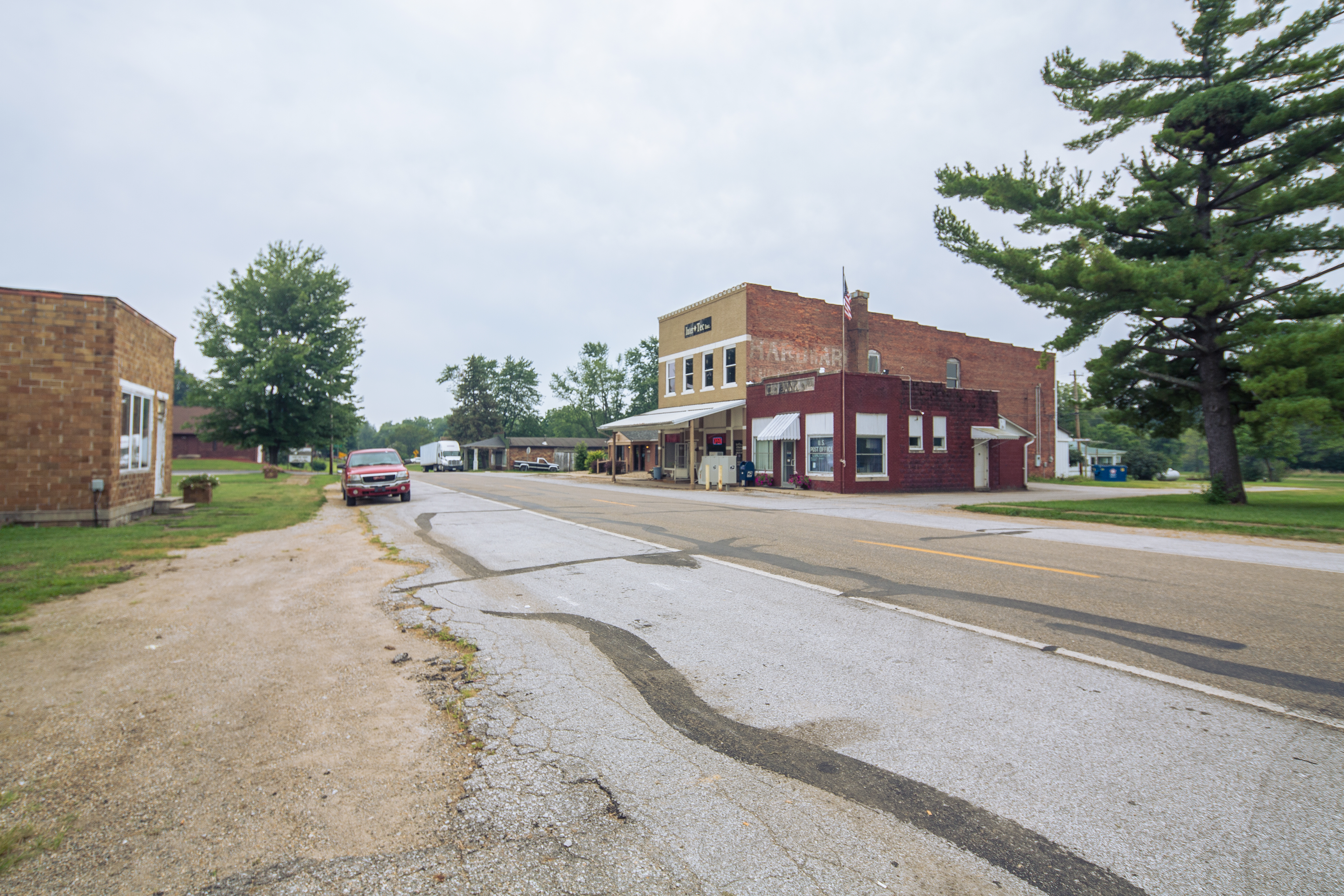

- Location within Indiana Location within the United States
- Coordinates: 39°13′49″N 87°02′45″W
- Country: United States
- State: Indiana
- County: Owen
- Township: Jefferson
- Elevation: 653 ft (199 m)
- Time zone: UTC-5 (Eastern (EST))
  - Summer (DST): UTC-4 (EDT)
- ZIP code: 47427
- Area codes: 812, 930
- GNIS feature ID: 432702

Coal City is a small unincorporated community located in Jefferson Township, Owen County, in the U.S. state of Indiana.

The town consists of only a grocery/restaurant, and a post office.

== History ==
In 1852, the village of Davidsburg was platted in Section 12, Town 9 north, Range 6 west, consisting of sixteen 6000 square foot lots, 100 by 60. The village changed its name to Stockton in 1854 to match its post office name, and prospered for the next two decades.

Coal City was platted in 1875 a couple miles west of Stockton, mainly in the southwest quarter of Section 11, Town 9 north, Range 6 west, consisting of 104 lots. Coal City was named for the local coal industry. A post office has been in operation at Coal City since 1877.

Businesses began to move from Stockton to Coal City once its post office was established. In 1879 the Stockton post office closed. The completion of the Cincinnati & Terre Haute Railway through Coal City caused it to thrive. By 1881 the plat of the town had almost doubled to 204 lots. It became a good trading and shipping point located in one of Indiana's richest coal fields.

The Cincinnati & Terre Haute Railway was soon succeeded by the Terre Haute & Southeastern Railroad.

== Demographics ==
The United States Census Bureau delineated Coal City as a census designated place in the 2022 American Community Survey.

== Notable person ==
- Bobby Grim, Indy car driver
