= Joseph Coghlan (politician) =

Former Irish politician

Joseph Coghlan was an Irish politician.

Coghlan was educated at Trinity College Dublin.

Coghlan represented Dublin University from 1689 to 1692; and Limerick City from 1695 until 1699.
