= Stockton Township =

Stockton Township may refer to the following townships in the United States:

- Stockton Township, Greene County, Indiana
- Stockton Township, Jo Daviess County, Illinois
- Stockton Township, New Jersey
