= John Vereker, 3rd Viscount Gort =

Anglo-Irish peer and politician

John Prendergast Vereker, 3rd Viscount Gort (1 July 1790 – 20 October 1865), was an Anglo-Irish peer and politician.

== Background and education ==
Gort was the son of Charles Vereker, 2nd Viscount Gort, and his first wife Jane, daughter of Ralph Westropp and Mary Johnson. He was educated at Harrow.

== Political career ==
Gort succeeded his father as Member of Parliament for Limerick in 1817 and held the seat until 1820. Between 1831 and 1832 he served as Mayor of Limerick. From June 1865 until his death in October of that year, he sat in the House of Lords as an Irish representative peer.

== Family ==
Lord Gort married firstly the Hon. Maria, daughter of Standish O'Grady, 1st Viscount Guillamore and Katherine Waller, on 13 December 1814. They had eleven children who survived infancy, six sons and five daughters, including:

- Standish, the eldest surviving son, (1819-1900)
- John Prendergast Vereker (1822-1891) who was Lord Mayor of Dublin in 1863,
- Emily, who married John Francis Basset, of the prominent Cornish Basset family of Tehidy,
- Maria Corinna (died 20 July 1856), who married Colonel Christian Monteith Hamilton and was the mother of General Ian Hamilton and the artist Vereker Monteith Hamilton.

After her death in April 1854, he married secondly Elizabeth Mary, daughter of John Jones and widow of George Tudor, MP for Barnstaple, in 1861. There were no children from this marriage. Lord Gort died in October 1865, aged 75, and was succeeded by his eldest son, Standish. He was the grandfather of Field Marshal John Gort, 6th Viscount Gort. Lady Gort died in October 1880.

== Notes ==
Parliament of the United Kingdom
Preceded by Hon. Charles Vereker	Member of Parliament for Limerick; 1817–1820	Succeeded by Thomas Spring Rice
Peerage of Ireland
Preceded by Charles Vereker	Viscount Gort; 1st creation 1842–1865	Succeeded by Standish Vereker
Political offices
Preceded by The Earl of Desart	Representative peer for Ireland; 1865	Succeeded by The Viscount Powerscourt
