= Stockton, Indiana =

- Unincorporated community
- Location within Indiana Location within the United States
- Coordinates: 39°14′20″N 87°01′20″W
- Country: United States
- State: Indiana
- County: Owen
- Township: Jefferson
- Elevation: 564 ft (172 m)
- Time zone: UTC-5 (Eastern (EST))
  - Summer (DST): UTC-4 (EDT)
- ZIP code: 47427
- Area codes: 812, 930
- GNIS feature ID: 444183

Stockton is an unincorporated community in Jefferson Township, Owen County, in the U.S. state of Indiana.

== History ==
Stockton was laid out in 1852. A post office was established at Stockton in 1855, and remained in operation until it was discontinued in 1877.

== Geography ==
Stockton is located at 39°14′20″N 87°01′20″W.
