= Charles Vereker, 2nd Viscount Gort =

Irish soldier and politician

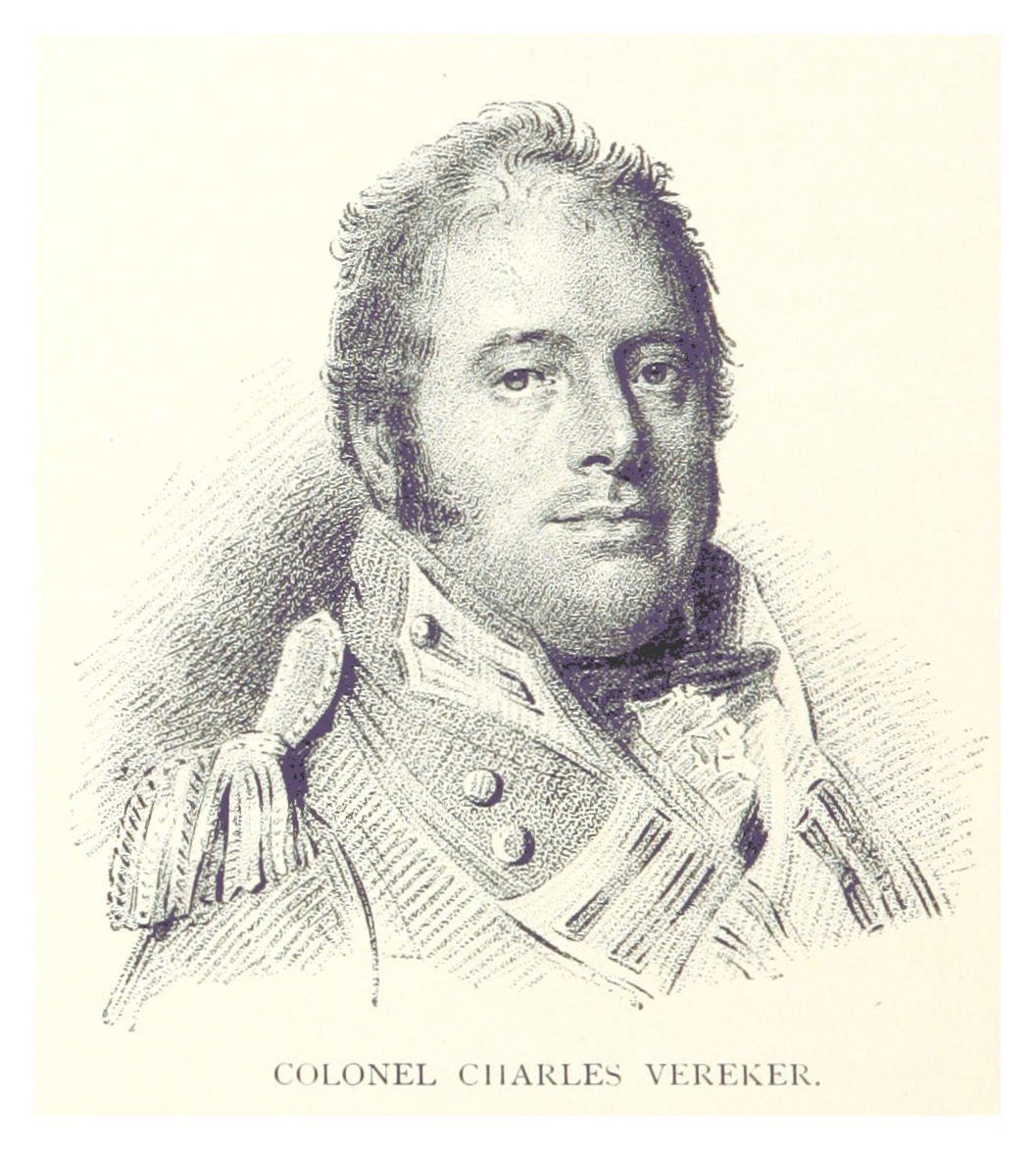
Portrait of Colonel Charles Vereker

Charles Vereker, 2nd Viscount Gort PC (Ire) (1768 – 11 November 1842), known as Charles Vereker until 1817, was an Irish soldier and politician.

== Background ==
Gort was the son of Thomas Vereker by Juliana, daughter of Charles Smyth and sister of John Prendergast-Smyth, 1st Viscount Gort and was born in Ireland in 1768. He served a short time in the navy, and was afterwards appointed lieutenant-colonel of the Limerick militia.

== Political career ==
Gort represented Limerick City in the Irish House of Commons from 1790 until the Act of Union in 1801. On 5 September 1798 at Collooney he checked the advance of a French force, led by General Humbert, that had landed at Killala Bay, County Sligo whereupon they were defeated at Ballinamuck, where he was wounded. In 1802 he was elected to the British House of Commons for Limerick, a seat he held until 1817, and served as a Lord of the Treasury between 1807 and 1812. He was sworn of the Irish Privy Council in 1809 and, having succeeded his uncle as second Viscount Gort in 1817, was elected an Irish representative peer in 1824. He also held the honorary posts of Constable of Limerick Castle from 1809 to 1842 and Governor of County Galway from 1814 to 1831.

He was amongst the most active opponents of the Union—"his name was found in every division and his voice in every debate;" and in answer to Lord Castlereagh's overtures he declared: "I have defended my country with my blood, and there is nothing in the gift of the Crown that would tempt me to betray her by my vote." After the Union, he represented Limerick until 1817, when by the death of his uncle he became Viscount Gort. He was a firm adherent of the Conservative party.

== Family ==
Lord Gort was twice married. He married firstly Jane, daughter of Ralph Westropp and Mary Johnson, in 1789. One of his relatives, a "Miss Vereker", married Ralph Westrop Jr. in 1792. After Jane's death in February 1798 he married secondly Elizabeth, daughter of John Palliser and Grace Barton, in 1810. There were children from both marriages. Lord Gort died on 11 November 1842, aged 74, and was succeeded by his son from his first marriage, John. Lady Gort died 2 April 1858 at Gort House, Petersham, London, and was buried at St Andrew's Church, Ham.

Following the 1798 Battle of Collooney, the thanks of Parliament were voted to him. By royal proclamation, he was permitted to augment his arms with the motto, "Collooney", so the rampant lion dexter supporter on his coat of arms displays a pennoncell with the motto "Collooney" raised on a lance. "Vincit Veritas" remained the motto of the family, located below the shield in a banderole.

His descendants include the Member of Parliament for Walthamstow, Stella Creasy, and the former Governor of Bermuda, John Vereker.

Parliament of Ireland
Preceded by John Prendergast Smyth; Hon. Edmund Pery	Member of Parliament for Limerick City; 1794–1801; With: John Prendergast Smyth 1794–1798; Henry Deane Grady 1798–1801	Succeeded by Parliament of the United Kingdom
Parliament of the United Kingdom
Preceded by Henry Deane Grady	Member of Parliament for Limerick; 1802–1817	Succeeded by Hon. John Vereker
Political offices
Preceded by The Viscount Powerscourt	Representative peer for Ireland; 1824–1842	Succeeded by The Viscount O'Neill
Peerage of Ireland
Preceded by John Prendergast-Smyth	Viscount Gort; 1st creation 1817–1842	Succeeded by John Prendergast Vereker
