= Thomas Smyth (bishop) =

Irish clergyman

Thomas Smyth (1650–1725) was a Church of Ireland clergyman who served as Bishop of Limerick from 1695 to 1725.

== Life ==
Smyth was born at Dundrum to William Smyth and Mary Dewdall. He was educated at Trinity College, Dublin and became vice-chancellor of the College in 1714.

A former Dean of Emly, Smyth was nominated Bishop of Limerick, Ardfert and Aghadoe on 15 November 1695 and consecrated on 8 December 1695. He died on 4 May 1725.

== Family ==
Smyth married Dorothea, daughter of Ulysses Burgh, Bishop of Ardagh and Mary Kingsmill, and had 10 sons and 3 daughters, including:

- Charles Smyth (1693–1784), MP for Limerick
- George Smyth (1705–1772), lawyer and judge
- Arthur Smyth (1706–1771), Archbishop of Dublin

Church of Ireland titles
Preceded by Ulysses Burgh	Dean of Emly; 1693–1695	Succeeded by Richard Reader
Preceded by Nathaniel Wilson	Bishop of Limerick, Ardfert and Aghadoe; 1695–1725	Succeeded by William Burscough
