= Stockton station =

Stockton station may refer to:

- Napton and Stockton railway station, Stockton, Warwickshire, UK
- Stockton – Downtown Station, also known as Robert J. Cabral Station, Stockton, California, U.S.
- Stockton – San Joaquin Street, also known as San Joaquin Street station, Stockton, California, U.S.
- Stockton railway station (County Durham), Stockton-on-Tees, England, UK
  - Stockton railway station (S&D), former station (closed 1848)
- Warthill railway station, Yorkshire, UK; before 1867 called Stockton station
