= Samuel Burdy =

Irish author

Samuel Burdy (c.1760–1820) was an Irish author, known as the biographer of Philip Skelton.

== Life ==
He was born at Dromore, County Down, about 1760, the only son of Peter Burdy, a merchant there. He obtained a sizarship by examination at Trinity College, Dublin, on 22 March 1777; was awarded a scholarship in 1780, and graduated B.A. in 1781. He was ordained in 1783, and in the same year was appointed curate of Ardglass, a parish in the county of Down.

Burdy was only once promoted, to the perpetual curacy of Kilclief, a small preferment in County Down. This was soon after 1800, and he died there in 1820.

== Works ==
In 1781 Burdy met the Rev. Philip Skelton, then in old age, and they became firm friends for the remaining six years of Skelton's life. Skelton lived in Dublin, and for three years Burdy used to visit him often. After Burdy left Dublin they corresponded till 4 November 1786. After Skelton's death Burdy researched for a biography, visiting Tyrone, Monaghan, and Donegal, to collect reminiscences of Skelton. In 1792 he published at Dublin The Life of the late Rev. Philip Skelton, with some curious anecdotes. The life was republished in London in two volumes, with the lives of Edward Pocock, Zachary Pearce, and Thomas Newton, in 1816. In 1824 a third edition appeared, prefixed to an edition of Skelton's works, edited by Robert Lynam, but with changes to the text of Burdy's biography.

Burdy also published:

- A Short Account of the Affairs of Ireland during the years 1783, 1784, and part of 1785 (1792);
- Ardglass or the Ruined Castles, also the Transformation, with some other poems (1802); the Belinda who is several times mentioned in Burdy's poetry is probably the daughter of Thomas Percy, but Burdy remained unmarried, because the bishop would not allow the match.
- A History of Ireland (1817).

== Notes ==
Attribution

This article incorporates text from a publication now in the public domain: Stephen, Leslie, ed. (1886). "Burdy, Samuel". Dictionary of National Biography. Vol. 7. London: Smith, Elder & Co.
