= Charles Smyth (politician) =

Irish politician (1693–1784)

Charles Smyth (1693–1784) was an Irish politician who served as Member of Parliament for Limerick City for 45 years.

== Family ==
Smyth was the son of Thomas Smyth, Bishop of Limerick, and Dorothea Burgh (daughter of Ulysses Burgh). His brothers included the lawyer and judge George Smyth and Arthur Smyth, Archbishop of Dublin.

In 1728 he married Elizabeth, the wealthy young widow of Sir John Dickson Haman, 1st and last Baronet. She was the daughter of Sir Thomas Prendergast, 1st Baronet, who was killed at the Battle of Malplaquet, and the sister of Sir Thomas Prendergast, 2nd Baronet. Charles and Elizabeth's children included Thomas Smyth and John Prendergast Smyth, 1st Viscount Gort, both of whom followed their father into politics. Their grandson Charles Vereker, son of their daughter Juliana, later inherited the Gort viscountcy.

== Career ==
Smyth was elected Member of Parliament for Limerick City in 1731 and represented the constituency until 1776 (except for a short gap in 1761). He also served as Mayor of Limerick in 1732.
