= Robert Downes (bishop) =

Irish Anglican bishop

Robert Downes DD (died 20 June 1763) was a Church of Ireland bishop in the mid 18th century.

Downes was the son of an Anglican bishop, Henry Downes. He was educated at Merton College, Oxford. He held incumbencies at Balteagh, Desertmartin and Kilcronaghan and was appointed Prebendary of Comber in 1734. He was Dean of Derry from 1740 until 1744; Bishop of Ferns and Leighlin from 1744 until 1752; Down and Connor from 1752 until 1753 and Raphoe from 1753 until his death on 20 June 1763.
