= Thomas Stockton (judge) =

Thomas Stockton (1609–1674) was an English-born judge who held office in seventeenth-century Ireland.

== Background ==
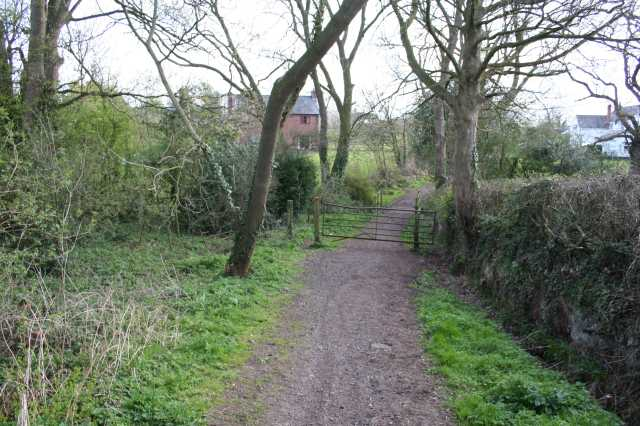
Cuddington Heath, Stockton's birthplace

He was born at Cuddington Heath, Cheshire, the eldest son and heir of John Stockton (died 1643), who was Lord of the Manor of Cuddington, and his second wife Sarah. The Stockton family suffered heavily for their loyalty to the Crown during the English Civil War, but they recovered their estates after the Restoration of Charles II, when Thomas received high praise for his personal fidelity to the King, "having suffered much in his person and fortune for his fidelity and allegiance". The second son, Richard Stockton, left England during the English Civil War for the Colonies where he disembarked in New York which was in Dutch hands at the time. Richard Stockton was a signer of the Flushing Remonstrance, and Richard Stockton's great-grandson, another Richard, was the signer of the United States Declaration of Independence for New Jersey.

== Career ==
He entered Gray's Inn in 1634 and became an Ancient of the Inn in 1658 (this was a position of prestige, ranking directly below the Readers of the Inn, and allowing the holder to practice law). He was called to the Bar in 1641. He went to Ireland in 1657, took up legal practice there and was admitted to the King's Inn. At the Restoration, his legal training together with his long and loyal service to the Crown made him an obvious choice for judicial office, and he was made third justice of the Court of King's Bench (Ireland). He went regularly on assize to Connaught and Ulster. Unlike many of his colleagues, he did not receive a knighthood.

He died in Dublin in 1674 and was buried in St. Michael's Church, Dublin; according to family tradition, his body was later reinterred in the family tomb at St Oswald's Church, Malpas, near his eldest son John.

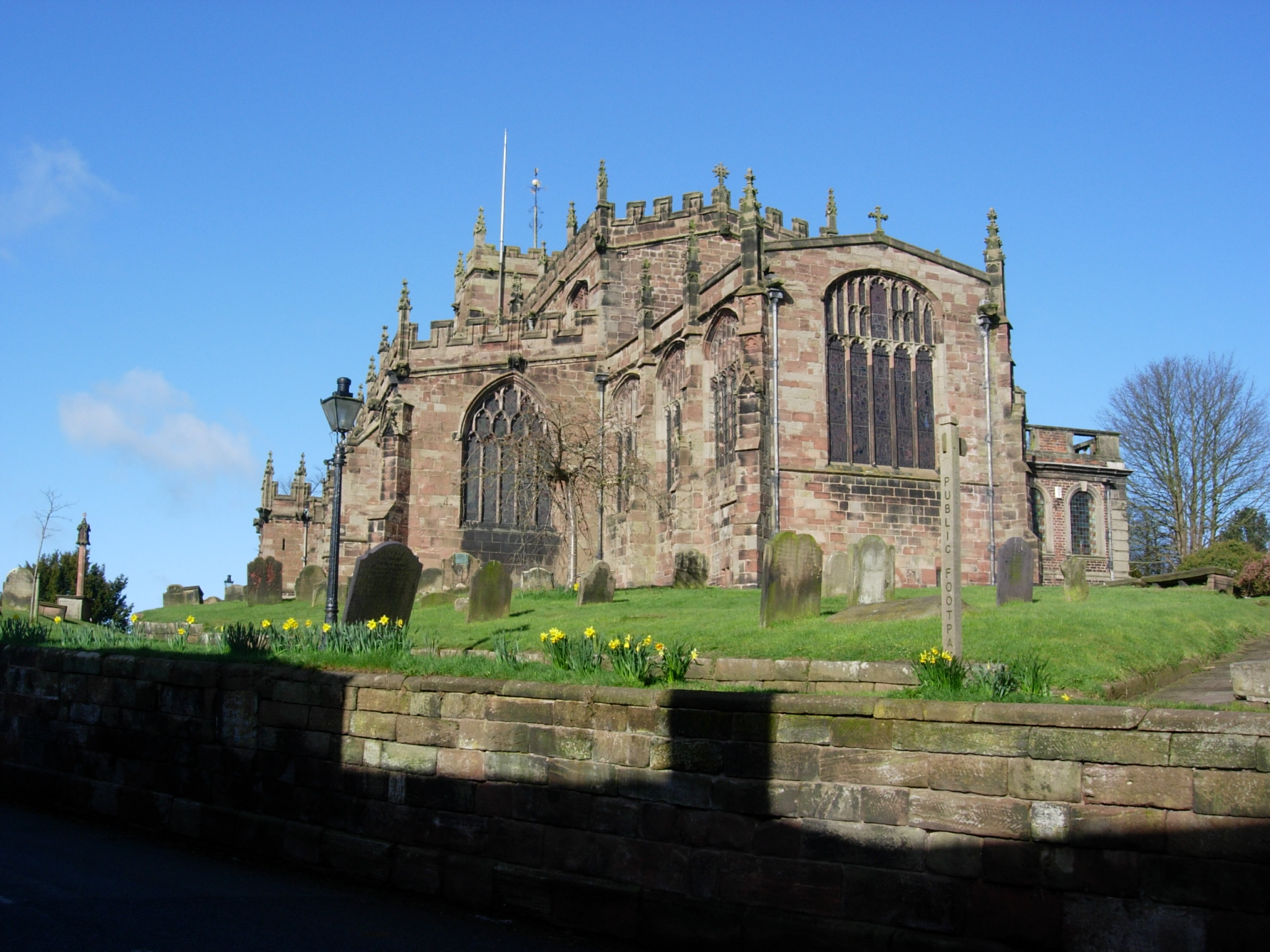
St Oswald's Church, Malpas Cheshire where Thomas Stockton is said to be buried - the southeast view.

== Family ==
He married Ursula Bellot, daughter of John Bellot of Great Moreton Hall, Cheshire and his wife Ursula Bentley, and sister of Sir John Bellot, 1st Baronet of the Bellot Baronets; she died in 1664. They had at least three children: John (died 1700), who inherited his father's estates, Thomas (died 1720), and one daughter, also called Ursula.

The younger Ursula married firstly, as his third wife, her father's colleague Sir William Aston (died 1671), by whom she had one surviving son, Thomas. She married secondly Sir Charles Feilding, a younger son of George Feilding, 1st Earl of Desmond and Bridget Stanhope, and had two daughters by him. Her descendants through her son married into the Tichborne family, who had the title Baron Ferrard and inherited the impressive Tichborne estate at Beaulieu.

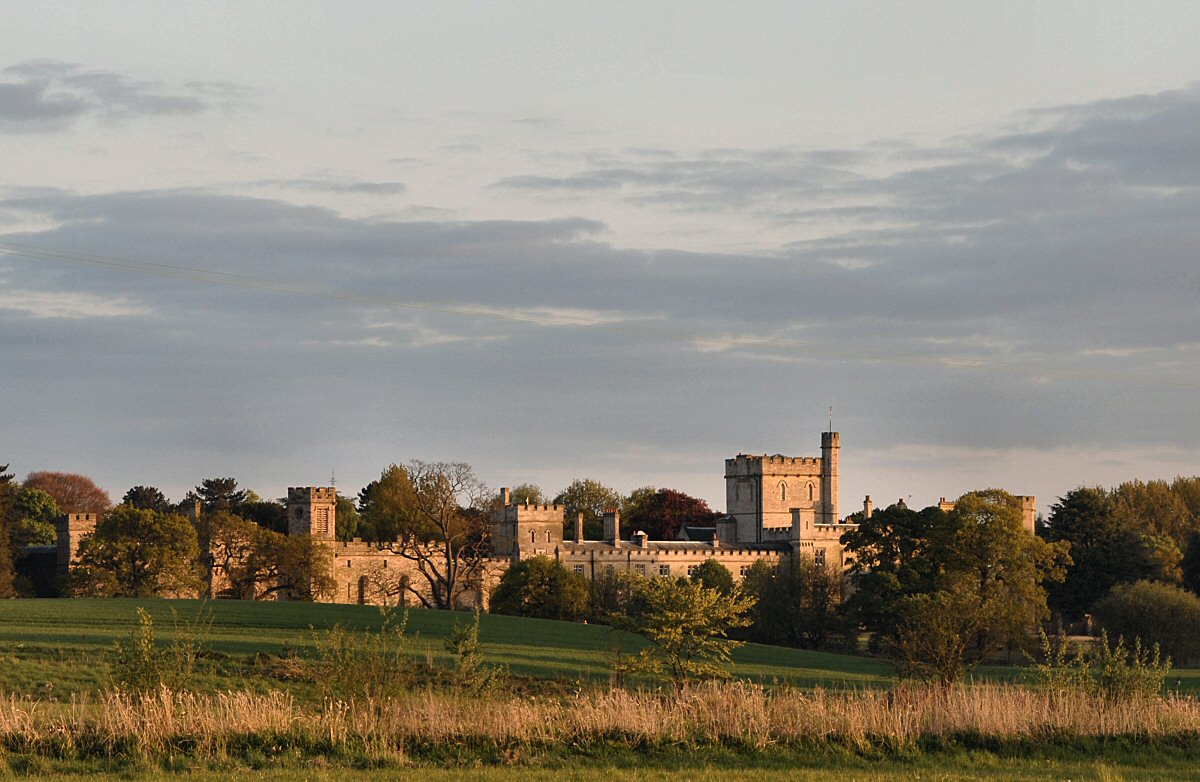
Great Moreton Hall, family home of Stockton's wife Ursula Bellot

Ursula was said to have been left very well provided for on her first husband's death, with a jointure of £300 a year. Her stepson, William Aston junior, was hanged for the murder of one Mr. Keating, who he claimed had insulted his wife, in Dublin in 1686. The death sentence was carried out despite "great intercessions for mercy" having been made on his behalf by Ursula, and by certain prominent Protestants who argued that religious bias had influenced the verdict, as the victim was a Roman Catholic, although the Government insisted that the trial was scrupulously fair.
