= Limerick City (Parliament of Ireland constituency) =

Pre-1801 Irish constituency

- Former borough constituency for the Irish House of Commons
- County: County Limerick
- Borough: Limerick

–1801
- Replaced by: Limerick City

Limerick City was a constituency represented in the Irish House of Commons until 1800.

== Members of Parliament ==
- 1376: Henry Bercley and Thomas Kildare were elected to come to England to consult with the king and council about the government of Ireland and about an aid for the king.
- 1559 Edward Arthur and Clement Fanning
- 1585 Thomas Arthur and Stephen White
- 1613 Sir Nicholas Arthur and James Galway
- 1634 Sir Geffrey Galwey, 1st Baronet and Dominick White
- 1639 Peter FitzAndrew Creagh and Dr Dominick FitzDavid White
- 1654 Protectorate Parliament - (Limerick City and Kilmallock) William Purefoy and Walter Waller
- 1658 Protectorate Parliament - (Limerick City and Kilmallock) Sir George Ingoldsby and Standish Hartstonge
- 1661 Sir Standish Hartstonge, 1st Baronet and Gerald Fitzgerald

=== 1689–1801 ===
Election	First MP		Second MP
1689	Nicholas Arthur		Thomas Harold
1692	Joseph Coghlan		Sir Charles Feilding
1695	Joseph Coghlan		Sir Joseph Williamson
1703	Robert Blennerhassett		Richard Ingoldsby
1713	Henry Ingoldsby		George Roche
1715	William Foord		George Roche
1727	Thomas Pearce		Henry Ingoldsby
1731	Thomas Pearce		Charles Smyth
1739	William Wilson		Charles Smyth
1741	Richard Maunsell		Charles Smyth
May 1761	Edmund Sexton Pery	Patriot	Hugh Dillon Massy
1761	Edmund Sexton Pery	Patriot	Charles Smyth
1776	Edmund Sexton Pery	Patriot	Thomas Smyth
1785	John Prendergast Smyth		Thomas Smyth
1786	John Prendergast Smyth		Edmund Henry Pery
1794	John Prendergast Smyth		Charles Vereker
1798	Henry Deane Grady		Charles Vereker
1801	Replaced by Westminster constituency of Limerick City		
