= Ulysses Burgh =

Irish Anglican cleric and Bishop of Ardagh (1632–92)

The Right Reverend Ulysses Burgh
- Bishop of Ardagh
- Native name: Ulysses de Búrca
- Church: Church of Ireland
- Diocese: Ardagh
- Elected: 8 September 1692
- In office: 1692
- Predecessor: Bishopric of Kilmore and Ardagh
- Successor: Bishopric of Kilmore and Ardagh
- Other post: Dean of Emly

Orders
- Consecration: 11 September 1692 by Francis Marsh

Personal details
- Born: Ulysses Burgh; 1632
- Died: 1692 (aged 59–60)
- Denomination: Anglican
- Parents: Rev. Richard Burgh (Bourke)
- Spouse: Mary Kingsmill
- Children: 8, including Thomas Burgh

Ulysses Burgh (English: /ˈbɜːr/; BER; 1632–1692) was an Irish Anglican cleric who was Dean of Emly (1685–1692) and Bishop of Ardagh (1692).

== Life ==
Burgh was born at the family estate, Drumkeen, County Limerick, son of the Reverend Richard Burgh (or Bourke). Drumkeen was burnt by Jacobite forces during the Glorious Revolution, but rebuilt, and remained the family home for generations.

Burgh was appointed Dean of Emly, in 1685. He was nominated as Bishop of Ardagh on 7 April 1692, appointed by letters patent on 8 September 1692 and was consecrated at Christ Church Cathedral, Dublin, on 11 September 1692. He died later in the same year. Although he owed his earlier advancement to King James II, he was a strong supporter of the Glorious Revolution.

== Family ==
Burgh married Mary, daughter of Colonel William Kingsmill of Ballinbeg Abbey, County Cork, and had at least eight children. Many of his descendants were people of distinction. His son Thomas Burgh was one of the foremost Irish architects of the eighteenth century: he designed Trinity College Library and Dr Steevens' Hospital among many notable other buildings. Two of Ulysses' other sons, Richard and William, sat in the Irish House of Commons. His daughter Dorothea married Thomas Smyth, Bishop of Limerick, and had a numerous family.

His great-grandson Ulysses Burgh, 2nd Baron Downes, was Surveyor-General of the Ordnance under Lord Liverpool between 1820 and 1827. Another great-grandson was Walter Hussey Burgh, Chief Baron of the Irish Exchequer, and one of the foremost orators of his generation.

== See also ==
- House of Burgh, an Anglo-Norman and Hiberno-Norman dynasty founded in 1193
- Church of Ireland
