= Magennis =

Family name

Magennis Mag Aonghusa
- Parent house: Ulaid (Dál nAraidi)
- Country: Kingdom of Ulster
- Founded: c.600
- Founder: Aonghus mac Aidiotha
- Final ruler: Art Mac Aonghusa
- Titles: King of Ulster; King of Uí Echach Cobo; Viscount Magennis of Iveagh
- Motto: Spes Mea In Deo
- Dissolution: 1693
- Cadet branches: Guinness (possibly)

Magennis (Irish: Mac Aonghusa), also spelled Maguiness or McGuinness, is an Irish surname, meaning the "son of Angus", which in eastern Ulster was commonly pronounced in Irish as Mag/Mac Aonghusa. A prominent branch of the Uíbh Eachach Cobha, the Magennises would become chiefs of the territory of Iveagh, which by the 16th century comprised over half of modern County Down. By the end of the 17th century, their territory had been divided up between them, the McCartan chiefs and English prospectors.

The four main branches of the Magennis clan were: Castlewellan, Corgary, Kilwarlin, and Rathfriland, between whom there was some rivalry. The Mac Artáin McCartan chiefs of Kinelarty, descend from the same genealogical line as the Magennis clan, through Artán, the son of Faghártagh, the son of Mongán Mac Aonghusa.

== Early history ==
The Magennis clan were a sept of the Ui hAitidhe, and descended from Sárán, a descendant of Eachach Cobha, of which the territory of Uíbh Eachach Cobha (Iveagh) derived its name. They ruled the sub-territory of Clann Aodha (Clan Hugh), however by the 12th-century had replaced the Ui hAitidhe as the chiefs of Iveagh, with Rathfriland as their base.

One of the earliest mentions of the Magennis as chiefs of Iveagh, is in the charter granted to the abbey of Newry in 1153, which was witnessed by Aedh Mor Magennis, who was cited as being chief of Clann Aodha and of Iveagh. The Magennises are also mentioned in letters by King Edward II, where they are titled Dux Hibernicorum de Ouehagh, meaning "chief of the Irish of Iveagh".

The Magennises allied themselves to the Earldom of Ulster, which was created after the Norman invasion of Ulster, until the death of William Donn de Burgh, 3rd Earl of Ulster in 1333. After the subsequent collapse of the earldom, the Magennises by the 15th century had expanded Iveagh all the way east to Dundrum Castle, where County Down meets the Irish Sea.

== 16th century ==
By 1500 there were twelve branches of the Magennis clan, the most prominent being: Castlewellan, Corgary, Kilwarlin, and Rathfriland, the rivalry between whom threatened the cohesion of Iveagh. Throughout the 16th century, the Magennis clan ensured they remained on good terms with the English. One chief, "Arthur Guinez", was on the losing side in the Battle of Bellahoe while invading County Meath in 1539. Art MacPhelim Magennis of Castlewellan (possibly the same man as Arthur Guinez) and Donal Óg Magennis of Rathfriland were both knighted by Henry VIII at Greenwich Palace in 1542, as a part of the new policy of surrender and regrant.

Sir Hugh Magennis, the son of Donal Óg Magennis, was called by Sir Henry Bagenal the "civillist of all the Irishry", with Sir Nicholas Bagenal cited as having brought Sir Hugh over to the Queen's side from that of O'Neills. In 1584 Sir Hugh was regranted 'the entire country or territory of Iveagh', but not including the territory of Kilwarlin. When Sir Hugh died in 1596, his heir was his son Art Roe Magennis, whose sister Catherine was married to Hugh O'Neill. As such Art Roe joined Hugh's side in the Nine Years' War against the English. During this war, Baron Mountjoy, the Lord Deputy of Ireland, ravaged Iveagh to the point where Art Roe Magennis submitted to prevent the extermination of his people, and as such was promised he could keep his lands.

== 17th century ==
Following the Nine Years' War and just before the process of colonising Ulster with loyal Protestant subjects, the arrangement of dividing mighty Gaelic lordships into smaller weaker lordships, such as what happened in County Monaghan with the MacMahon's, occurred with Iveagh. In 1605 the "Commission for the Division and Bounding of the Lords" was established to replicate the Monaghan arrangement, with Art Roe Magennis applying to be made Lord Iveagh. In February 1607, the commission however decided to break up Iveagh, a process that continued until 1610, seeing the creation of fifteen freeholds. The Magennises were granted thirteen of these freeholds, with Art Roe being granted the largest. The rest however was given to officers in the Crown forces, most of whom had served in the Nine Years' War under Sir Henry Bagenal and Sir Arthur Chichester.

Amongst the freehold grants to the Magennises were:

- Ever MacPhelimy Magennis of Castlewellan, who was granted eleven townlands, constituting the Castlewellan estate in the parishes of Kilmegan and Drumgooland.
- Brian MacHugh MacAgholy Magennis of Muntereddy, who was granted seven and a half townlands, constituting the Bryansford estate in the parishes of Maghera (Bryansford) and Kilcoo. This estate was held by the Earl of Roden on account of his descent from Brian.

Sir Arthur Magennus, stated as being chief of the Magennises in 1610, granted from his own large estate to his kin:

- Glassney Roe Magennis of Ballymoney, three townlands.
- Fer-doragh MacFellimey MacPrior Magennis of Clanvarraghan, three townlands in Kilmegan parish.

The lands the Magennises held in these Iveagh freeholds diminished as the officers and other speculators went about extending their possessions at their expense through legal and illegal means. The failure of the native Irish to properly understand the English legal system resulted in them accruing large debts resulting in them having to sell vast swathes of their lands or losing them as collateral when they failed to pay their debts. Despite finally being appointed Lord Iveagh in 1623, Art Roe Magennis also found himself in a dangerous financial position

== Viscount Magennis of Iveagh ==
Despite finally being ennobled in 1623 as Viscount Magennis of Iveagh, giving him a seat in the Irish House of Lords, Art Roe Magennis also found himself in a dangerous financial position. His wealth was assessed at £7,000 in 1620, but the viscountcy had cost him £2,000 and he was expected to live on a grander scale befitting his title. The viscount therefore sold thousands of acres in the 1620s and 1630s to the Scottish-origin landowners Sir James Hamilton and Sir Hugh Montgomery, who looked to County Down to expand their own holdings in Ulster, and acquired lands in Iveagh, Kinelarty and Lecale. This had the effect of dislocating the centuries-old clan structure of the Magennises and MacCartans.

Many of the disgruntled and dispossessed Magennises joined in the Irish rebellion of 1641 and the subsequent War of the Three Kingdoms, with two of the six Ulster delegates on the Confederate Supreme Council being Magennises. Following this and the Cromwellian conquest of Ireland. In March 1653, under Arthur, 3rd Viscount Magennis of Iveagh, Belturbet, Cavan was the last town in Ireland to fall to Cromwell; the final Irish stronghold at nearby Cloughoughter held out for a further month.

The Magennises of Iveagh lost out significantly with all their lands but those at Tollymore being forfeited, with four of the leading Magennis freeholders transplanted to the province of Connacht. Following the Restoration of the British monarchy in 1660, King Charles II restored Phelimy Magennis and his son Ever to their Castlewellan estates upon their conversion to Protestantism. The king also sought to have the 20,161-acre ancestral estate of Arthur Magennis, 3rd Viscount Iveagh, restored, but this was prevented by local landowners. Under the Act of Settlement 1662 as amended, and with royal intervention, by 1670 he was given 4,452 acres in Connacht in part-compensation, with just 40 acres in County Down. His grandson helped the losing side in the Williamite War in Ireland and forfeited everything in 1693.

In 1689, Viscount Iveagh and three other Magennises sat in what became known as the Patriot Parliament in 1689, the only session of the Irish Parliament under King James II.

== Viscounts Magennis of Iveagh ==
The viscountcy lasted from 1623 to 1693 in the peerage of Ireland:

- Art Roe (d 1629); created viscount in 1623; married to Sarah, a daughter of Hugh O'Neill, Earl of Tyrone
- Hugh (1599–1639); married Mary Bellew of Bellewstown
- Arthur (died 1683); married Margaret O'Reilly.
- Hugh (1630–84); married Rose O'Neill
- Bryan (d.1692); married Lady Margaret Burke (died 1744), daughter of William Burke, 7th Earl of Clanricarde
- Phelim (d. before 1701)

In 1693 the title became attainted after the Williamite War in Ireland.

== People ==
- James Joseph Magennis (1919–1986), Northern Irish recipient of the Victoria Cross
- Josh Magennis (born 1990), Northern Irish professional footballer
- Kyle Magennis (born 1998), Scottish footballer
- William Magennis (1867–1946), Irish politician and university professor
- Art Magennis (1919–2019), Irish recipient of the Distinguished Service Medal with Honour for bravery in the Congo

The name can also be spelt "McGuinness", as in:

- John McGuinness (disambiguation)
- Paddy McGuinness, comedian from Greater Manchester
- Paul McGuinness, manager of U2
- Martin McGuinness
- Mairead McGuinness

In America the name is more often spelt "Maginnis"; see:

- Ken Maginnis, Baron Maginnis of Drumglass (born 1938), Northern Irish politician
- Charles Donagh Maginnis
- John Maginnis
- Martin Maginnis
- Niall MacGinnis
- Robert P. Maginnis
- Ross A. McGinnis
- Maginnis & Walsh

A branch of the family also spelt the name with one "n" –

- Richard Magenis, MP in the Irish Parliament
- Richard Magenis, MP for Enniskillen
- Sir Arthur Magenis, diplomat
- William Magenis, Dean of Kilmore

Other variant spellings include:

- Alban Maginness
- Paul McGennis
- McGinnis
- Ennis
- Maginnes

The name is also spelt without the Mac/Mc prefix. See Guinness (surname).

== Titles ==
The heir of the former lords of Iveagh was created Viscount Magennis of Iveagh in the Irish peerage in 1623 by King James I of England. The title was attainted in 1693 after the Williamite war. Claiming descent from the Magennis clan, Sir Edward Guinness took the title Lord Iveagh in 1891, and then Earl of Iveagh in 1919. In 2001 Ken Maginnis was granted a life peerage as Baron Maginnis of Drumglass.

== Places ==
- Dundrum Castle, Norman castle in County Down, formerly known as Magennis castle.

== See also ==
- Iveagh House
- Guinness
