= Arthur Magenis =

British diplomat (1801–1867)

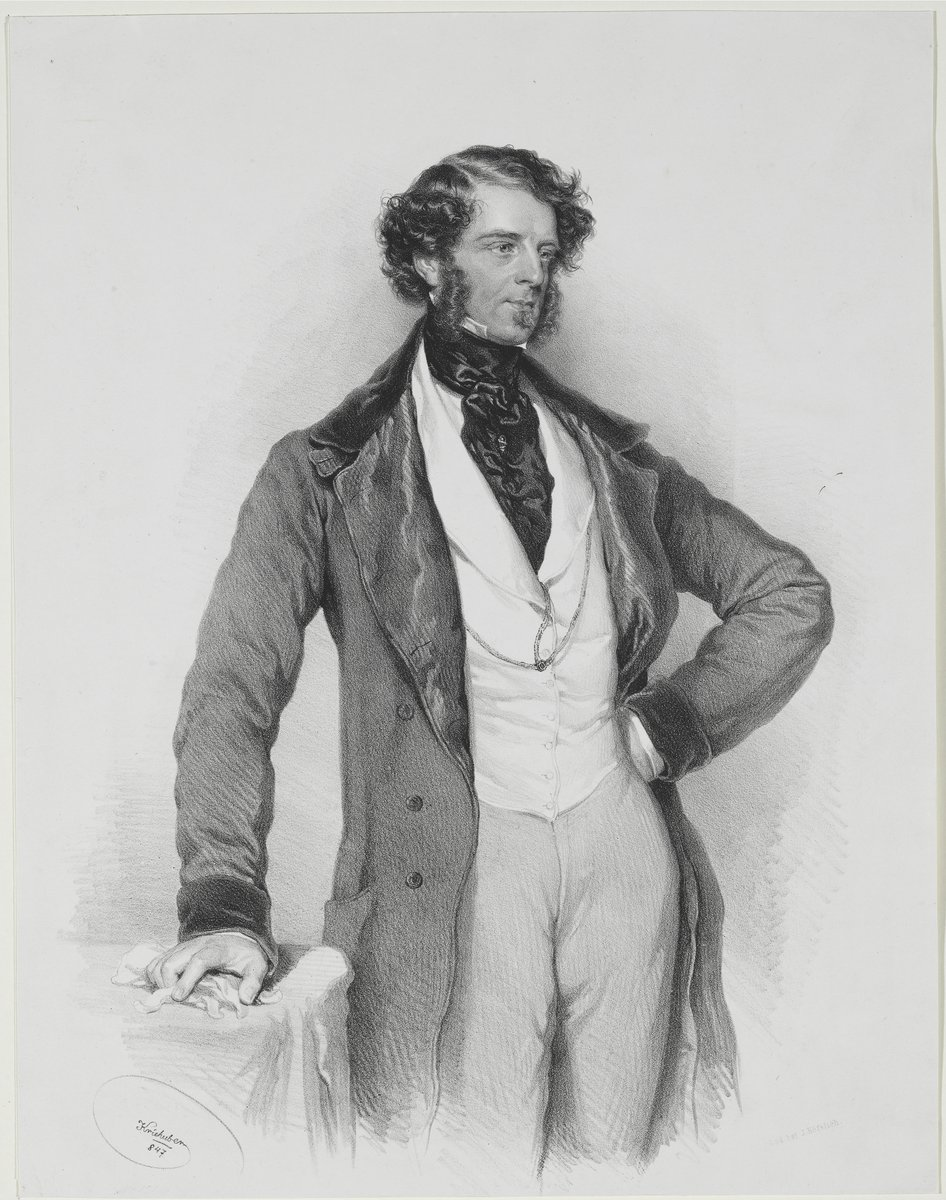
Arthur C. Magenis by Josef Kriehuber

Sir Arthur Charles Magenis GCB (c. 1801 – 14 February 1867) was an Anglo-Irish diplomat who served as British Ambassador to the Kingdom of Portugal, the Kingdom of Sweden and Norway, Switzerland, and the Kingdom of Württemberg.

== Early life and education ==
Magenis was born in County Fermanagh, the fifth son of Richard Magenis (also spelt Magennis; c. 1763–1831), MP for Enniskillen (1812–28), and his first wife, Lady Elizabeth Anne Cole, daughter of William Cole, 1st Earl of Enniskillen. His sister Florence Catherine married John Ashley Warre. He was the nephew of Very Rev. William Magenis, Dean of Kilmore.

He was educated at Trinity College Dublin, where he graduated in 1822 with honours.

== Career ==
After university, Magenis entered the diplomatic service and in August 1825 became an attaché to the British Legation at Berlin. He transferred to the Embassy in Paris the following year and to Saint Petersburg in 1830.

In January, 1837, Magenis was invited by Alexander Pushkin who met him at a ball in Countess Maria Razumovskaya's house in Saint Petersburg, to be his second before his fatal duel with Georges d'Anthès. Magenis declined the proposition once he understood that the conflict could not be resolved before the duel.

From 1838–44, he served Secretary of Legation in Bern, Switzerland, where he acted as chargé d'affaires in 1839 and 1840.

From September 1844 to October 1851, he was Secretary to the British Embassy in Vienna, Austrian Empire. He acted as Minister Plenipotentiary ad interim during Sir Robert Gordon's absence from 31 July 1845 to April 1846, and served as chargé d'affaires during the absence of Gordon's successor, Lord Ponsonby, from 1 June to 16 August 1849. He served as Minister Plenipotentiary during Ponsonby's absence 20 April to 19 July 1848 and again in the interim following Ponsonby's departure on 31 May 1850 until the arrival of his successor, John Fane, 11th Earl of Westmorland, on 13 October 1851.

He also served as Minister Plenipotentiary to the Swiss Confederation in Bern from January 1851 to April 1852.

He served simultaneously as Envoy Extraordinary and Minister Plenipotentiary in Stuttgart (then capital of the Kingdom of Württemberg) and as Minister Plenipotentiary in Karlsruhe (capital of the Grand Duchy of Baden). from 1852–54. He was posted to Stockholm in 1854 to serve as Envoy Extraordinary and Minister Plenipotentiary. His appointment in June 1859 to serve as Envoy Extraordinary and Minister Plenipotentiary to the Kingdom of the Two Sicilies was cancelled and instead he was transferred to Lisbon in November 1859, where he served until retirement in 1866.

He was appointed a Knight Commander of the Order of the Bath (KCB) in September 1856. In July 1866, the month following his retirement, he was appointed Knight Grand Cross of the Order (GCB).

== Death of Pushkin ==
In 1837, the esteemed Russian poet Alexander Pushkin asked Magenis, then attaché to the British Consulate-General in Saint Petersburg, to be his second at his doomed duel with his brother-in-law Baron d'Anthès van Heeckeren, a member of Russia's Imperial Knight Guards. Pushkin had faced scandalous rumours that his beautiful young wife, Natalia, was having an affair with d'Anthès de Heeckeren, who had recently married her sister. The scandal escalated to a duel between the two men. Pushkin saw Magenis as a very decent man and respected him for his honest disposition. Magenis agreed to discuss the matter with d'Anthès's second, Viscount Olivier d'Archiac (1811–1848), attaché at the French Embassy; however, since Magenis was not formally Pushkin's second, d'Archiac refused any discussion. Magenis searched for Pushkin, however, he had already left for home. Afraid of waking Pushkin's wife, Natalia, Magenis sent Pushkin a note at 2 o'clock in the morning. He declined to be his second because the possibility of a peaceful settlement had already been quashed, and the first responsibility of the second was to try to bring about a reconciliation. Thus Pushkin failed to obtain a second.

I have just returned from Countess Razumovsky's (Note: Konstantina Dominika Iosepha Turgheim) where I sought you everywhere to tell you that I have just spoken to Mons-r d'Archiac. Not finding you, I supposed that you had left, and as a visit at this hour could awaken the suspicions of Madame your wife, I prefer to address these lines to you.

I told Mons-r d'Archiac that you had spoken to me of your affair with Monsieur de Heeckeren, engaging me to act as your second—and that without taking on this role definitively I had promised to speak to him. He refused to discuss it with me unless I declared myself your second, which I did not do. The matter thus remained at that, and I promised him to inform you of what passed between us.

However, I think I have understood that the affair cannot be settled peaceably, the hope of which might have tempted me to intervene; consequently I must beg you, Sir, not to request me to take on the role that you wished. I must confess myself flattered by the trust which you are kind enough to place in me, and I thank you once again. Nor do I believe that my refusal will cause you embarrassment.

— Arthur Magenis,

Thus on 8 February 1837, the duel went ahead at Saint Petersburg's Black River, where Pushkin was fatally injured and died two days later. D'Anthès de Heeckeren was promptly arrested but was pardoned by Tsar Nicholas I. He was discharged from the Russian Army and deported along with his wife.

== Notes ==
Diplomatic posts
Preceded by Edmund Lyons	Minister Plenipotentiary to the Swiss Confederation; 1851–1852	Succeeded by Sir Andrew Buchanan, 1st Baronet
Preceded by Sir Alexander Malet	Envoy Extraordinary and Minister Plenipotentiary to the Kingdom of Württemberg; 1852–1854	Succeeded by George Jerningham
Preceded by Edmund Lyons	Envoy Extraordinary and Minister Plenipotentiary to the King of Sweden and Norway; 1854–1859	Succeeded by George Jerningham
Preceded by Henry Howard	Envoy Extraordinary and Minister Plenipotentiary to the Kingdom of Portugal; 1859–1866	Succeeded by Sir Augustus Paget
