= Richard Magenis =

Richard Magenis may refer to:

- Richard Magenis (died 1807) (c. 1710–1807), Anglo-Irish politician
- Richard Magenis (died 1831) (c. 1763–1831), Anglo-Irish politician
- Richard Henry Magenis (1832–1880), High Sheriff of Antrim
