= Elizabeth Hawkins-Whitshed =

Irish mountaineer, author and photographer (1860–1934)

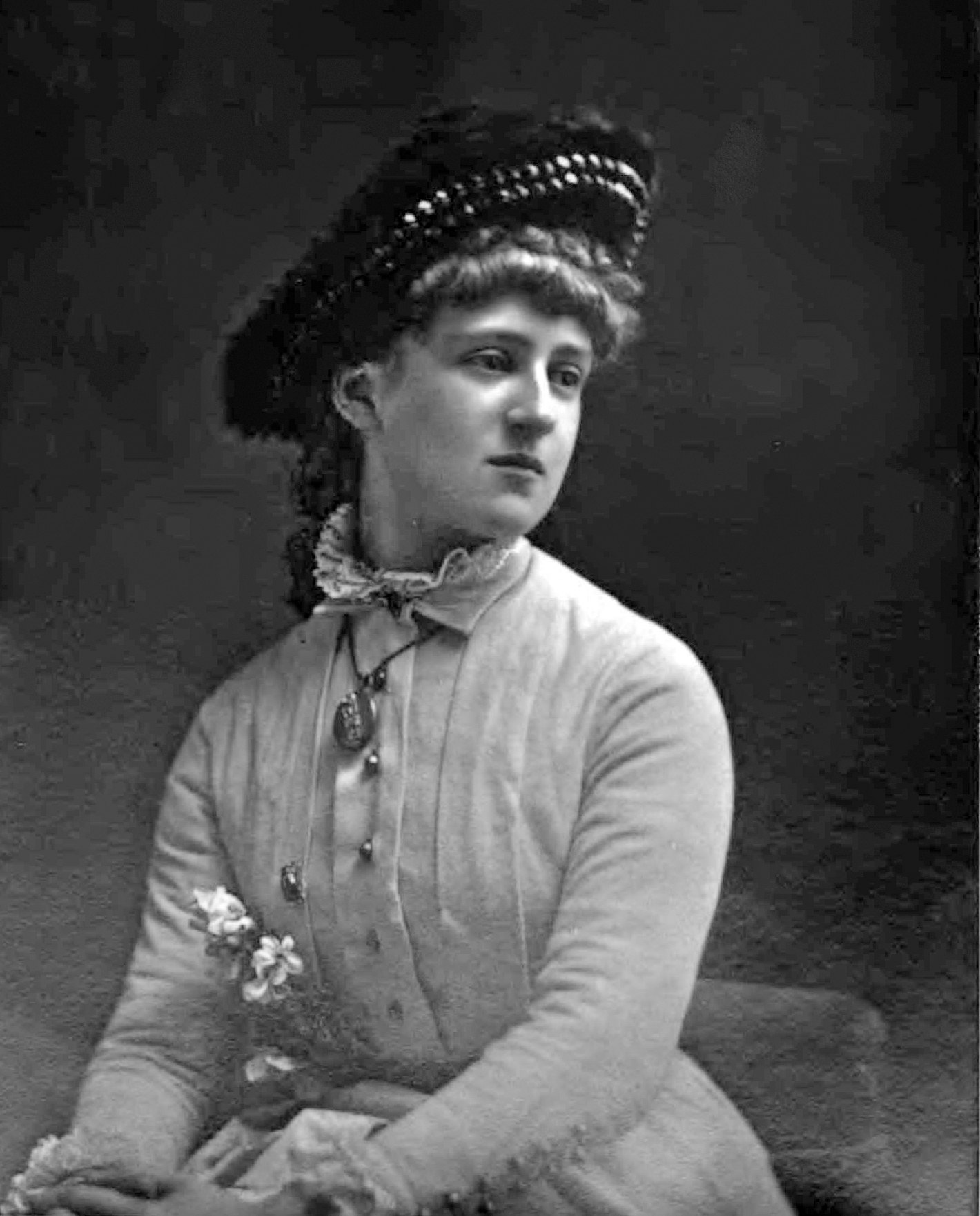

Personal information
- Nickname: Lizzie Le Blond
- Nationality: Irish
- Born: Elizabeth Alice Frances Hawkins-Whitshed; 26 June 1860 Dublin, Ireland
- Died: 27 July 1934 (aged 74) Llandrindod Wells, Wales
- Occupations: photographer, autobiographer
- Spouses: Frederick Burnaby (m. 1879; died 1885); John Frederick Main (m. 1886; died 1892); Francis Bernard Aubrey Le Blond (m. 1900)
- Children: 1
- Relatives: Sir James Hawkins-Whitshed, 1st Baronet (great-grandfather); James Hawkins (great-great-grandfather)

Climbing career
- Type of climber: mountaineer, alpinist, winter climbing
- Updated on 8 July 2020

Elizabeth Alice Frances ‘Lizzie’ Hawkins-Whitshed (married name Le Blond, formerly Burnaby and Main; 26 June 1860 – 27 July 1934) was an Irish mountaineering pioneer, author, and photographer celebrated for documenting alpine landscapes. At a time when female participation in mountaineering was rare, she achieved prominence for her ascents and distinctive attire, often photographed climbing in long skirts.

Relocating to Switzerland, Hawkins-Whitshed began climbing during the 1882–1883 season, later gaining recognition for her pioneering ascents and photographic work. In 1907, she played a leading role in founding the Ladies' Alpine Club, serving as its inaugural president. Over her career, she authored seven books on mountaineering and achieved 20 first ascents—summiting peaks previously unclimbed. In her lifetime, Lizzie conquered over 100 mountains in total.

Her legacy endures as a trailblazer who defied gender norms in alpine exploration while making a significant contribution to the documentation of mountain geography through writing and photography.

== Early life ==
Hawkins-Whitshed was born Elizabeth Alice Frances Hawkins-Whitshed on 26 June 1860 in Dublin to Sir St Vincent Bentinck Hawkins-Whitshed, 3rd Baronet (1837–1871) of Killincarrick House in Greystones, County Wicklow, and Anne Alicia Hawkins-Whitshed (née Handcock; died 1908). Through her father, Hawkins-Whitshed was the great-great-granddaughter of the James Hawkins, the Bishop of Raphoe, and the great-granddaughter of the naval officer Sir James Hawkins-Whitshed, 1st Baronet. Hawkins-Whitshed was also related to Bentinck family, Dukes of Portland and Charles Stewart Parnell.

Raised at Killincarrick House, Hawkins-Whitshed was educated by a governess from the age of 8. Following her father's death in 1871, Hawkins-Whitshed became the heir to Killincarrick House and nearly 2,000 acres of land across County Dublin, Meath and Wicklow. As she was still a minor, Hawkins-Whitshed became a ward in chancery. Hawkins-Whitshed lived with her mother at Killincarrick House and in London, where she made her debut during the 1878 season.

=== Marriages and family ===
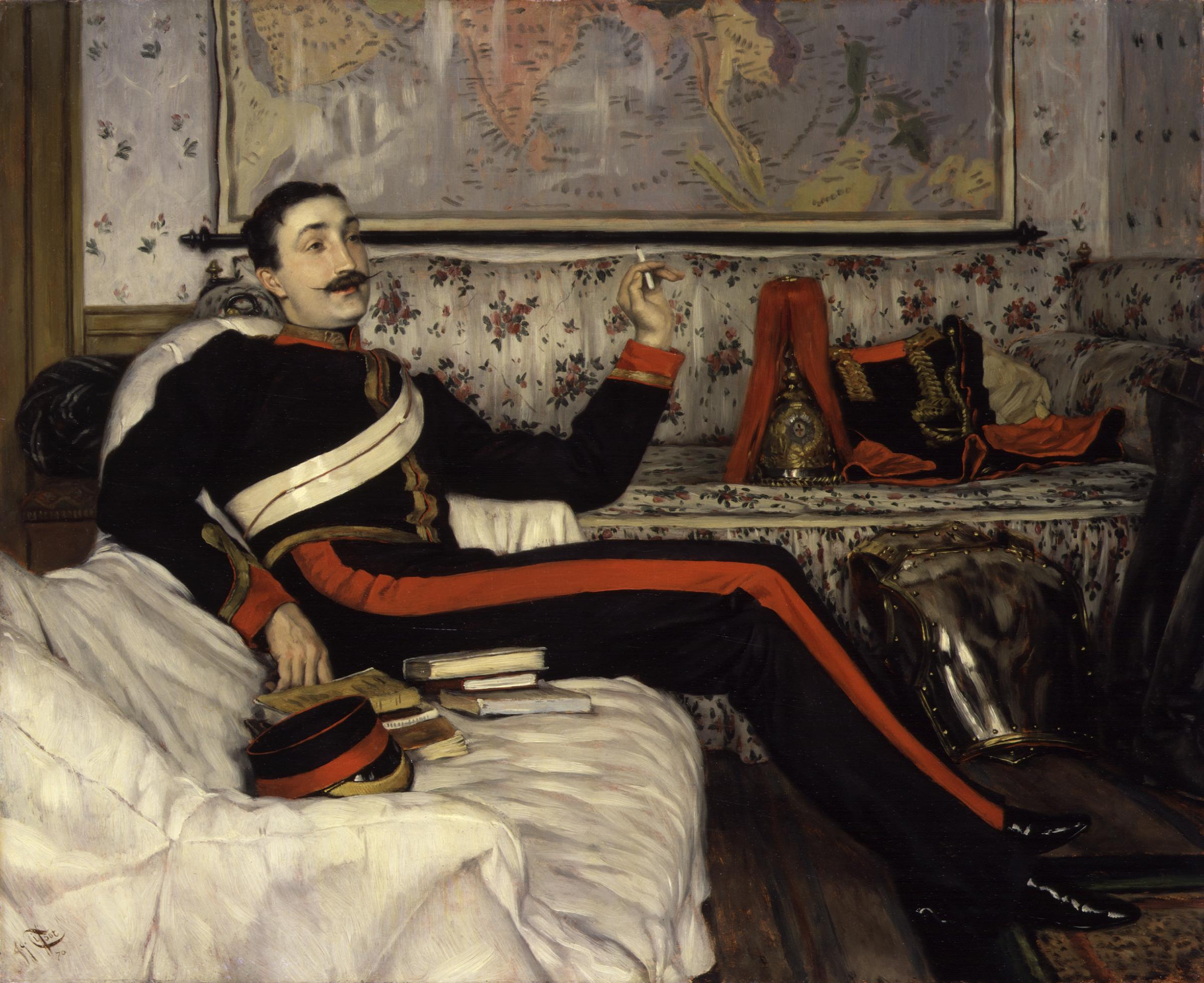
Her First husband Frederick Gustavus Burnaby. Portrait of Frederick Burnaby painted by James Tissot, 1870

During her first season, Hawkins-Whitshed became engaged to Frederick Burnaby, a British Army officer, adventurer and future intelligence officer, who was 18 years her senior. On 25 June 1879, Hawkins-Whitshed and Burnaby married at St Peter's Church, London. The couple's son was born the following year.

The couple largely lived apart thereafter until Burnaby's death during the Battle of Abu Klea in Sudan on 17 January 1885. During this period, Elizabeth sought treatment abroad for chronic respiratory issues.

=== Mountaineering and photography ===
In 1881, Elizabeth relocated to Switzerland, where she began climbing during the 1882–1883 season. She gained renown for ascending peaks in long skirts, a practice documented in widely circulated photographs. A pivotal figure in alpine exploration, she achieved 20 first ascents—summiting previously unclimbed peaks—and authored seven mountaineering books. In 1907, she co-founded the Ladies' Alpine Club, serving as its inaugural president.

=== Filmmaking career ===
Under the name Mrs. Aubrey Le Blond (after her third marriage), she produced at least ten films in Switzerland's Engadine Valley, capturing alpine sports such as ice hockey in St. Moritz and tobogganing on the Cresta Run. Regarded as one of the world's earliest female filmmakers, alongside Alice Guy-Blaché and Laura Bayley, her work was showcased by James Williamson at Hove Town Hall in November 1900 and included in his 1902 catalogue. Her films earned praise from cinema pioneer Cecil Hepworth and author E. F. Benson.

== Personal life ==
Elizabeth Hawkins-Whitshed married three times: first, in 1879, to British Army officer Frederick Burnaby (1842–1885); second, in 1886, to John Frederick Main (d. 1892 in North America); and third, in 1900, to Francis Bernard Aubrey Le Blond. From her first marriage, she had a son, Harry Burnaby, born in 1880. Despite her subsequent marriages, the lands in Greystones, County Wicklow, which she inherited from her father prior to wedlock, retained the name Burnaby Estate.

Developed in the early 20th century, the estate—locally known as The Burnaby—included streets such as Burnaby Road, Somerby Road, Whitshed Road, St. Vincent's Road, Portland Road, and Hawkins Lane, reflecting familial and aristocratic connections. Hawkins-Whitshed published her mountaineering writings under her marital surnames: Mrs. Fred Burnaby, Mrs. Main, and Mrs. Aubrey Le Blond.

She authored the autobiography Day In, Day Out (1928), chronicling her life and adventures. Hawkins-Whitshed died on 27 July 1934 and was buried at Brompton Cemetery in London.

== Authorship ==
Elizabeth Hawkins-Whitshed authored works under both her maiden name, Elizabeth Hawkins-Whitshed, and her later married name, Mrs. Aubrey Le Blond. She also employed the pseudonym Jean Ville for select publications. While she found fulfilment in writing, her greatest passion lay in photography, a craft she practised avidly, often seen with her camera slung over her shoulder during expeditions.

Her literary career began in 1883 with The High Alps in Winter, a work chronicling alpine mountaineering experiences that preceded a series of books and articles on the subject. Later, she ventured into fiction, travelogues, and family history, though her talent for documenting mountain landscapes remained central to her legacy.

Among her pursuits in mountaineering, photography, and writing, Hawkins-Whitshed produced 69 distinct works, extant in 220 publications across three languages, with 2,228 library holdings recorded worldwide.

== Mountaineering ==
Abandoning the conventional London lifestyle of the mid-1880s, Elizabeth Hawkins-Whitshed relocated to Chamonix, where her inaugural climb saw her ascend two-thirds of Mont Blanc. Although now known for photographs depicting her climbing in long skirts, she discreetly changed into practical attire when out of public view to avoid social censure. The interior of her basecamp tents - often furnished with fine clothing, a comfortable bed, drapes, and an elaborate toiletry setup - reflected her aristocratic background. Despite declining health due to chronic lung issues, her determination to climb remained undiminished. Her expeditions abroad doubled as quests for medical remedies, a pursuit that galvanised her resolve.

In 1881, she settled in Switzerland, the epicentre of European mountaineering. Over two decades, Hawkins-Whitshed summited Mont Blanc twice and conquered numerous challenging Swiss peaks. Later, she shifted her focus to Lapland and the Norwegian Arctic, where six consecutive summers of exploration shed light on uncharted regions. This phase yielded over 100 ascents, including 20 first ascents. Her expeditions leveraged her wealth and status: she travelled with personal staff, and the perilous conditions were starkly illustrated when her maid required rescue from an ice-encased carriage during one journey.

In 1907, Hawkins-Whitshed co-founded the Ladies' Alpine Club, serving as its inaugural president. Her achievements demonstrated extraordinary resilience, inspiring generations of women to challenge gendered norms in mountaineering and adventure sports.

== Photography ==
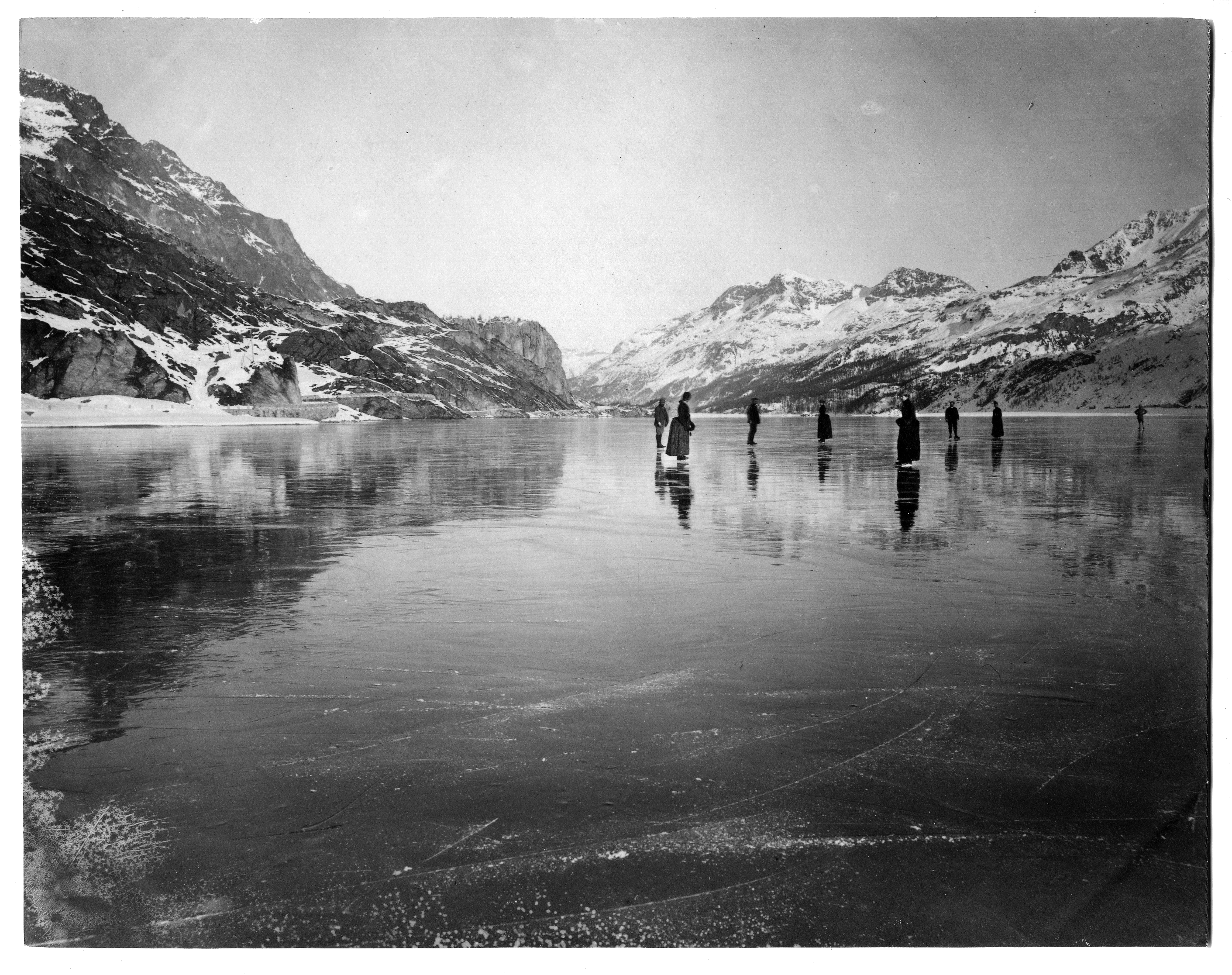
Elizabeth Main: Skating on the lake of Sils

From the outset of her climbing career, Elizabeth Hawkins-Whitshed documented her expeditions with a camera, capturing unprecedented alpine vistas. She became an early innovator in snow photography, pioneering techniques to record glacial landscapes. Elected to the Photographic Society of Great Britain (later Royal Photographic Society) in 1886, she exhibited regularly at its annual exhibitions from 1885 to 1903 under the names Jean Ville, Mrs. Main, and Mrs. Aubrey Le Blond.

Hawkins-Whitshed produced thousands of photographs, approximately 400 of which illustrated publications such as Water, its Origin and Use by William Coles Finch. She developed and printed her own work, often in challenging field conditions, distributing prints as charitable fundraisers, personal gifts, or prizes at mountaineering events. Over 2,000 of her photographs (1886–1903), many annotated with unpublished captions, are held by the Martin and Osa Johnson Safari Museum in Chanute, Kansas, USA.

Her legacy was celebrated in a 2003 exhibition at Pontresina Alpine Museum, Switzerland. In 2011, the Greystones Historical Society donated a curated volume of her work to Greystones Library during Ireland's National Heritage Week. Following the 2013 donation of her archives to the Safari Museum, a permanent exhibition, Queen of the Mountain, opened in November 2023, showcasing her photography and writings.

== Selected works ==
- The High Alps in Winter, or Mountaineering in Search of Health (1883)
- Mountaineering in the Land of the Midnight Sun
- Adventures on the Roof of the World
- True Tales of Mountain Adventure: For Non-Climbers Young and Old
- My Home in the Alps
- High Life of Towers and Silence
- Charlotte Sophie, Countess Bentinck: Her Life and Times, 1715–1800
- The Old Gardens of Italy: How to Visit Them
- Day In, Day Out (1928)

== See also ==
- Augusta Caroline Crofton

== Sources ==
- Brief biography of "Miss Main" – in German
- History of Greystones in County Wicklow – with information on the Burnaby Estate and the Hawkins-Whitshed family
- Descendants of Willem Bentinck and Charlotte Sophie of Aldenburg by Hein Bruins – source for family information
- Raughter, R. (2012). A Victorian Lady in the High Alps, Elizabeth Hawkins-Witshed of Killincarrick.
- Murtagh P. (2013) Victorian-era Women photographers celebrated
- MacLachlan, J. M. (2004). Peak performances: Cultural and autobiographical constructions of the Victorian female mountaineer (Order No. NQ90225). Available from ProQuest Dissertations & Theses A&I. (305057898). Retrieved from ProQuest 305057898
- Raughter, R. (2012). A Victorian Lady in the High Alps, Elizabeth Hawkins-Witshed of Killincarrick. Our Wicklow Heritage, Greystones Archaeological and Historical Society. Retrieved from
- Le, E. A. F. H. W., & Le Blond, M. A. (1883). The High alps in Winter: Or, Mountaineering in Search of Health. S. Low, Marston, Searle, & Rivington
- Siggins, L. (2013, Dec 09). "An Irishwoman's diary". The Irish Times Retrieved from ProQuest 1736287655
