= Guinness (surname) =

Guinness (Irish: Mag Aonghuis) is a surname. Notable people with the surname include:

- Alec Guinness (1914–2000), British actor
- Arthur Guinness (1725–1803), founder of Guinness beer
- Arthur Guinness (New Zealand politician) (1846–1913)
- Bunny Guinness (born 1955), British landscape architect and broadcaster
- Daphne Guinness (born 1967), artist
- Desmond Guinness (1931–2020), Irish writer on Georgian art and architecture
- Humphrey Patrick Guinness (1902–1986), British polo player
- Jasmine Guinness (born 1976), model and designer
- Kenelm Lee Guinness (1887–1937), racing driver and spark plug manufacturer
- Matthew Guinness (born 1940), British actor
- Oonagh Guinness (1910–1995), Anglo-Irish socialite and society hostess
- Os Guinness (born 1941), author
- Peter Guinness (disambiguation), multiple people

== See also ==
- Guinness family, prominent descendants of Arthur Guinness (1725–1803) and his brother Samuel Guinness (1727–1795)
- Magennis
