= Denis Browne =

Denis Browne may refer to:

- Denis Browne (bishop) (1937–2024), New Zealand bishop
- Denis Browne (priest) (1796–1864), Dean of Emly, 1850–1864
- Denis Browne (politician) (1763–1828), Irish politician
- Denis Browne, 10th Marquess of Sligo (1908–1991), Irish peer
- Denis Browne (surgeon) (1892–1967), Australian-born British surgeon

== See also ==
- William Denis Browne (1888–1915), British composer
- Dennis Brown (disambiguation)
- Denis Browne bar, medical device for the treatment of clubfoot
