= William Evelyn (priest) =

Irish Anglican cleric

William Evelyn was Dean of Emly from 1875 until his death in March 1776.

Church of Ireland titles
Preceded by James Hawkins	Dean of Emly; 1776– 1818	Succeeded by Richard Moore
