= Thomas Webb (priest) =

Thomas Webb MA was Dean of Kilmore from 1768 to his death in 1797.

Church of Ireland titles
Preceded by Charles Agar	Dean of Kilmore; 1768– 1797	Succeeded by George Beresford
