= Dean of Emly =

Church of Ireland official

The Dean of Emly was based at The Cathedral Church of St Alibeus, Emly in the former Diocese of Emly within the Church of Ireland. St Alibeus' cathedral was demolished in 1877.

== List of deans of Emly ==
- 1245–1251 Gilbert O'Doherty (Gilbertus)(afterwards Bishop of Emly, 1251)
- 1272 Maurice
- 1295 Philip
- 1305 William Roughead
- 1418 John Pellyn
- 1502 Raymond de Burgh
- 1542 Donogh Ryan
- 1602 Hugh Hogan
- 1608 Kennedy M'Brian
- 1615 John Darling
- 1621–1626 Edward Warren (afterwards Dean of Ossory, 1626)
- 1627 John Crayford
- 1640 William Burleigh
- 1666 Tempest Illingworth
- 1669 George Mundy
- 1675–1685 Robert Ewing
- 1685–1692 Ulysses Burgh (afterwards Bishop of Ardagh, 1692)
- 1693–1695 Thomas Smyth (afterwards Bishop of Limerick, Ardfert and Aghadoe, 1695)
- 1697–1700 Richard Reader (afterwards Dean of Kilmore, 1700)
- 1700/1–1709 Enoch Reader
- 1710–1713 John Wetherby (afterwards Dean of Cashel, 1713)
- 1714–1735 William Perceval
- 1735–1736 James Auchmuty (afterwards Dean of Armagh, 1736)
- 1736–1765 John Brandreth
- 1765–1766 John Averell (afterwards Dean of Limerick, 1766)
- 1766–1775 James Hawkins (afterwards Bishop of Dromore, 1775
- 1775–1776 William Evelyn
- 1776–1818 Richard Moore
- 1818–1826 Henry Vesey-Fitzgerald (afterwards Dean of Kilmore, 1826)
- 1826–1845 Thomas Philip Le Fanu
- 1845–1851 Brabazon William Disney (afterwards Dean of Armagh, 1851)
- 1852–1864 Denis Browne
- 1864–1867 William Alexander (afterwards Bishop of Derry and Raphoe, 1867)
- 1867-1870 Vacant pending disestablishment
