= William Magenis =

William Magenis (c. 1770 – 22 January 1825) was an Anglo-Irish priest who served as Dean of Kilmore from 1801 until his death at age 54.

Magenis, also spelt Magennis, was the second of two sons of Richard Magenis, MP in the Parliament of Ireland, and Elizabeth Berkeley, daughter of Col. William Berkeley and niece of George Berkeley, Bishop of Cloyne. His elder brother was Richard Magenis, MP for Enniskillen, who was the father of diplomat Sir Arthur Magenis.

There is a memorial to him in Kilmore Cathedral.

Church of Ireland titles
Preceded by George de la Poer Beresford	Dean of Kilmore; 1801– 1825	Succeeded by Henry Vesey-FitzGerald
