= John French (Dean of Elphin) =

Irish Anglican priest

John French (7 November 1770 – 14 February 1848) was an Anglican priest in Ireland.

French was born in Roscommon educated at Trinity College, Dublin. He was Dean of Elphin from 1797 until his death.

He married Emily Magenis, third daughter of Richard Magenis of Waringstown.
