= Richard Magenis (died 1807) =

Anglo-Irish politician (1710-1807)

Captain Richard Magenis (1710–1807) was an Anglo-Irish politician who sat in the House of Commons in the Parliament of Ireland.

== Early life and career ==
Magenis, whose surname is also spelt Magennis or Maginnis, was Anglo-Irish gentry. He was the eldest son of Richard Magenis of Dublin and Alicia Caddell, daughter of William Caddell of Downpatrick, County Down. He was the elder brother of Very Rev. William Magenis, Dean of Kilmore.

He represented Bangor from 1783–90, Fore (1794–98), and then Carlingford from 1798 until 31 December 1800, when it was dissolved upon the Union of Great Britain and Ireland.

He also served as High Sheriff of Antrim in 1760, High Sheriff of Armagh in 1762, and High Sheriff of Down in 1764. He died in 1807, aged 96.

== Marriage and issue ==
Richard Magenis married firstly, 5 December 1760, to a Miss Wray, who died shortly after. On 31 December 1767, he married secondly, Elizabeth Berkeley (died 5 April 1831), daughter of Col. William Berkeley and sister of George Berkeley, Bishop of Cloyne. They had two sons and five daughters:

- Richard Magenis (c. 1767–1831), MP for Enniskillen
- Very Rev. William Magenis (c. 1770–1825), Dean of Kilmore
- Ellen, married Col. Charles Albert Leslie, of Tandragee
- Louisa, married William Richardson, M.P. for Armagh
- Emily, married Very Rev. John French, Dean of Elphin
- Alice
- Harriette

Parliament of Ireland
Preceded by Hon. Edward Ward; Edward Hunt	Member of Parliament for Bangor; 1783–1790; With: Edward Hunt	Succeeded by Sir John Blackwood; Sir John Parnell
Preceded by Stephen Fremantle; John Macartney	Member of Parliament for Fore; 1794–1798; With: John Macartney	Succeeded by Robert Ross; Hon. Richard Annesley
Preceded by Robert Ross; Robert Johnson	Member of Parliament for Carlingford; 1798–1800; With: Sir Thomas Lighton	Succeeded by Parliament of the United Kingdom
Honorary titles
Preceded by James Leslie	High Sheriff of Antrim; 1760	Succeeded by Alexander Boyd
Preceded by Daniel Kelly	High Sheriff of Armagh; 1762	Succeeded by Sir Richard Johnston
Preceded by Thomas Rowe	High Sheriff of Down; 1764	Succeeded by Sir Richard Johnston
