= Richard Moore (Church of Ireland priest) =

Irish Anglican cleric

Richard Moore, MA was Dean of Emly from 1818 until his death on 31 March 1818.

Church of Ireland titles
Preceded by William Evelyn	Dean of Emly; 1776– 1818	Succeeded by Henry Vesey-FitzGerald
