= Thomas O'Beirne =

18th/19th-century Irish bishop

Thomas Lewis O'Beirne (1749 – 17 February 1823) was an Anglican bishop, Bishop of Ossory from 1795 to 1798 when he was translated to Meath.

== Life ==
Born in 1749, the eldest son of a Roman Catholic farmer, he was educated at the Catholic College of St Omer before converting to Anglicanism. Ordained a priest in 1773, he was entered on the books of Trinity College, Cambridge as a ten-year man the same year.

His ecclesiastical career began with a college living at Grendon, Northamptonshire 1774–1776, following which he was a naval chaplain under Admiral Howe in 1776. In 1776 he preached in St. Paul's Church in New York City. Later he was Vicar of West Deeping 1779-1783 and chaplain and private secretary to the Duke of Portland 1782–1783.

Returning to his native Ireland he became the incumbent at Templemichael, from which post he ascended to the episcopate: He became Anglican bishop of Ossory in 1795, and in 1798 was transferred to the see of Meath.

He died on 17 February 1823.

According to Mark Boyd, O’Beirne's career began when, as a young man, he shared his leg of mutton on a rainy day with three strangers in a countryside inn in Surrey. One of the three men turned out to be the Duke of Portland, who gave him a seat in his carriage to London and, within a fortnight, asked if he was willing to take orders in the Church of England, in which case the duke would place his sons under his charge at Oxford or Cambridge and would ensure that he received early preferment after completing his university course.

== Notes ==
Church of Ireland titles
Preceded by William Beresford	Bishop of Ossory; 1795–1798	Succeeded by Hugh Hamilton
Preceded by Henry Maxwell	Bishop of Meath; 1798 –1823	Succeeded by Nathaniel Alexander
