= James Tate (headmaster) =

- Born: 11 June 1771; Richmond, North Yorkshire, UK
- Died: 2 September 1843 (aged 72); Clifton, Bristol
- Other name: Dr Tate
- Education: Richmond School Sidney Sussex College, Cambridge (MA)
- Occupation: Headmaster
- Employer: Richmond School
- Political party: Whig

James Tate (11 June 1771 – 1843) was the headmaster of Richmond School and canon of St Paul's Cathedral, London.

== Early life ==
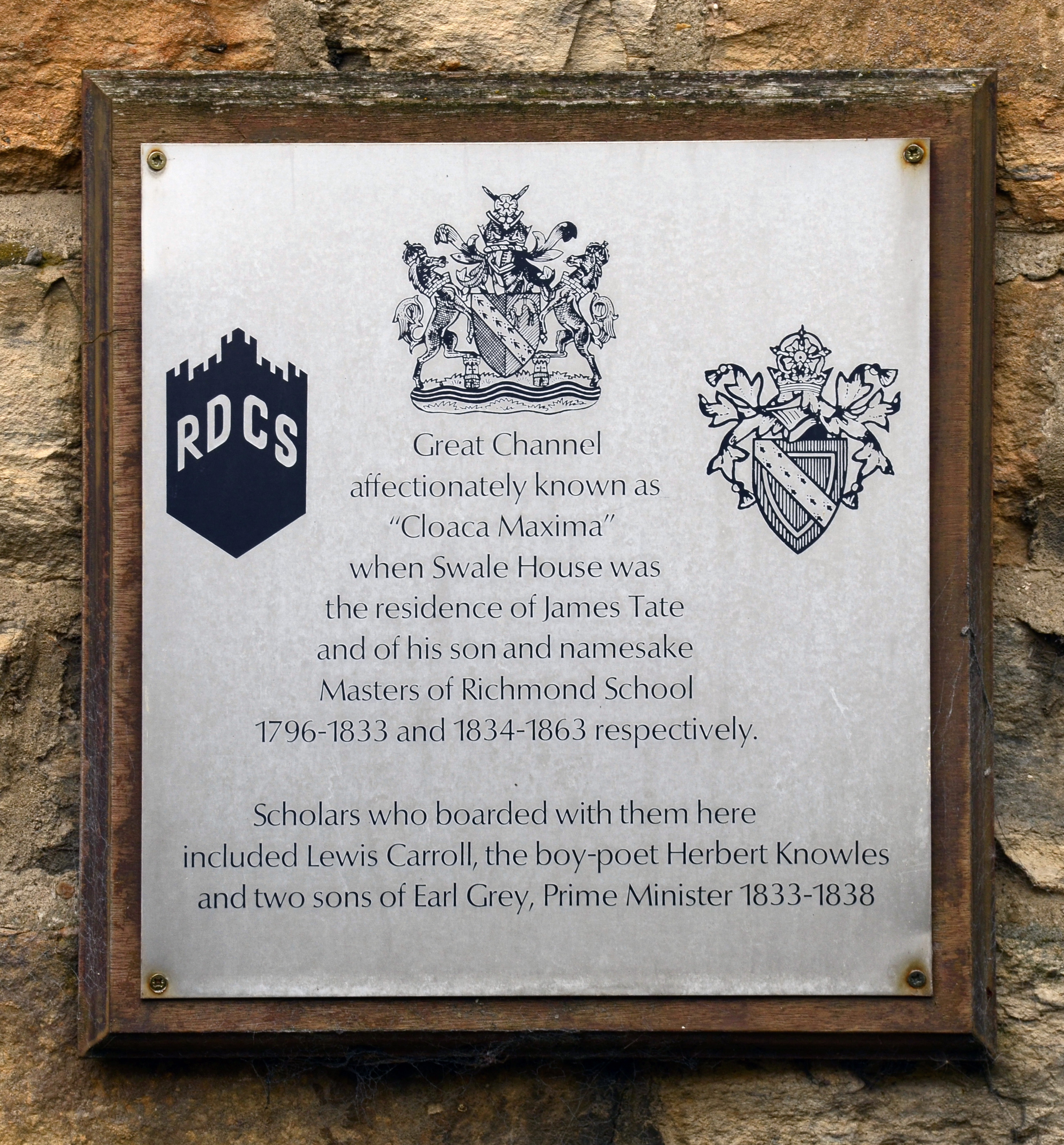
Plaque for James Tate (father & son)

He was born in Richmond, North Yorkshire on 11 June 1771, the only surviving son of Thomas Tate, a working maltster originally from Berwick upon Tweed, and his wife, Dinah Cumstone, who came from a family of small farmers in Swaledale.

Having attended two private schools, in May 1779, Tate entered Richmond School. Whilst there, the headmaster Reverend Anthony Temple recognised his talent, and in 1784 found him a job as amanuensis to the rector of Richmond Francis Blackburne. Enjoying access to Blackburne's library acted as a stimulus for Tate, who with Temple's help obtained a sizarship at Sidney Sussex College, Cambridge.

Tate was appointed headmaster of Richmond School on 27 September 1796, the fulfillment of a childhood ambition. Tate was responsible for transforming Richmond School into one of the leading classical schools of its day, and the leading Whig school, attracting boys from throughout the country, at a rate of 100 guineas a year.

== Tate's invincibles ==
Between 1812 and 1833 six pupils a year on average proceeded to university. 21 of them became fellows, 13 of them at Trinity College, Cambridge. They became so "successful, admired and feared" whilst at Cambridge that they earned the title of 'Tate's invincibles'. Their number included George Peacock, Richard Sheepshanks, Marcus Beresford and James Raine. Another pupil was Herbert Knowles. Tate rejected corporal punishment for his pupils, and refused to rule by fear, but instead inspired in them a love of learning.

== Classical scholar ==
Tate was a widely respected classical scholar. Robert Surtees, the Durham antiquary, recalled a night spent with him quoting from The Iliad, and Sydney Smith, who by chance travelled in the same coach as Tate, declared to a friend that Tate was "a man dripping with Greek". The Times printed a glowing obituary, noting that "as a teacher of classical learning, none of his contemporaries were more successful".
