= Richard Reader =

17th/18th century Irish dean

Richard Reader was an Irish Dean in the last decade of the 17th century and the first year of the 18th.

A former Dean of Emly, Reader was briefly Dean of Kilmore in 1700.

Church of Ireland titles
Preceded by Thomas Smyth	Dean of Emly; 1697–1700	Succeeded by Enoch Reader
Preceded by Enoch Reader	Dean of Kilmore; March 1700– Sept 1700	Succeeded by Jeremiah Marsh
