= Dennis Brown (disambiguation) =

Dennis Brown (1957–1999) was a Jamaican reggae singer.

Dennis Brown may also refer to:

== Sports ==
- Dennis Brown (Bermudian footballer) (fl. 1990s–2010s), Bermudian footballer and football manager
- Dennis Brown (defensive end) (born 1967), American football player
- Dennis Brown (English footballer) (born 1944), English footballer
- Dennis Brown (quarterback) (born c. 1948), American football player
- Dennis Brown (rugby) (born 1944), Welsh rugby league footballer
- Denny Brown (born 1956), American former professional wrestler

== Others ==
- Dennis Brown (academic) (fl. 1970s–2010s), American professor of medicine
- Dennis C. Brown (fl. 1980s–2010s), American film and television composer
- Dennis Brown (died 2023), subject of a Panera Bread Charged Lemonade wrongful death lawsuit

== See also ==
- Denis Browne (disambiguation)
- Denise Brown (disambiguation)
