= Marcus Beresford (bishop) =

Irish bishop

The Right Reverend and Right Honourable Marcus Beresford PC (Ire), D.D.
- Archbishop of Armagh; Primate of All Ireland
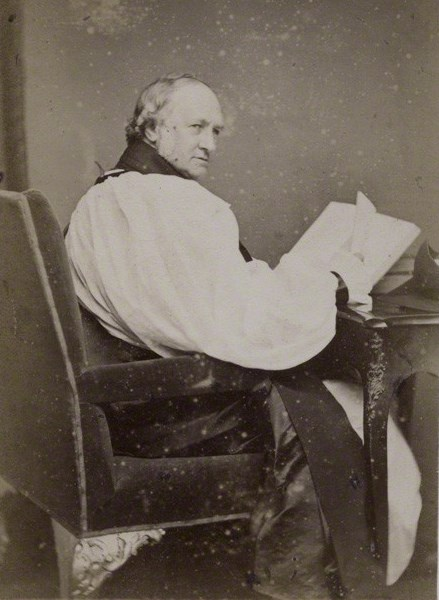
- Church: Church of Ireland
- See: Armagh
- Appointed: 15 October 1862
- In office: 1862-1885
- Predecessor: Lord John Beresford
- Successor: Robert Knox
- Previous post: Bishop of Kilmore, Elphin and Ardagh (1854–1862)

Orders
- Ordination: 1825
- Consecration: 24 September 1854 by John Beresford

Personal details
- Born: 14 February 1801 Dublin, Ireland
- Died: 26 December 1885 (aged 84) Armagh, Ireland
- Buried: St Patrick's Cathedral, Armagh
- Denomination: Anglican
- Parents: George Beresford & Frances Parker Bushe
- Spouse: Mary L'Estrange; Elizabeth Trail-Kennedy
- Children: 5, including George
- Education: Richmond School; Trinity College, Cambridge

Marcus Gervais Beresford DCL PC (Ire) (14 February 1801 – 26 December 1885) was the Church of Ireland Bishop of Kilmore, Elphin and Ardagh from 1854 to 1862 and Archbishop of Armagh and Primate of All Ireland from 1862 until his death.

== Early life ==
Beresford was born in 1801 at the Custom House, Dublin, then the town house of his grandfather, John Beresford, a unionist Member of Parliament, and was a great-grandson of Marcus Beresford, 1st Earl of Tyrone. He was the second son of George Beresford, Bishop of Kilmore and later of Kilmore and Ardagh, and of his wife Frances, a daughter of Gervase Parker Bushe and a niece of Henry Grattan. Beresford belonged to a family "connected for generations with the highest dignity and power in the civil and ecclesiastical administration of Ireland”.

Educated at Richmond School under Dr Tate and at Trinity College, Cambridge, he graduated BA in 1824, MA in 1828 and DD in 1840. He was later awarded the degree of Doctor of Civil Laws by Oxford in 1864.

== Career ==
In 1824, Beresford was ordained deacon and in 1825 priest, and was quickly appointed Rector of Kildallon, County Cavan, a parish in his father's diocese of Kilmore. Three years later, he was preferred to the vicarages of Drung and Larah in the same diocese, benefices which he held until 1839 when he became archdeacon of Ardagh when Ardagh was united with Kilmore. His father was succeeded by Bishop Leslie, but on Leslie's death in 1854 Beresford followed in his father's footsteps as bishop of Kilmore and Ardagh and was consecrated in Armagh Cathedral on 24 September 1854.

In 1862, following the death of his first cousin once-removed Lord John Beresford, Beresford was translated to succeed him as Archbishop of Armagh and Primate of All Ireland, holding also the see of Clogher. As Archbishop, Beresford was appointed to the Privy Council of Ireland and also sometimes acted as a lord justice for the government of Ireland in the absence of the Viceroy.

In the Church, Beresford gained the reputation of being a statesmanlike presence during the storms which were caused by William Ewart Gladstone's measures to bring about disestablishment of the Church of Ireland, playing a large part in the negotiations this called for, and then afterwards had the hard task of reconstituting the church.

Beresford died at Armagh on 26 December 1885 and was entombed there in St Patrick's Cathedral.

== Wives and children ==
On 25 October 1824 Beresford married Mary, a daughter of Henry L'Estrange of Moystown and the widow of R. E. Digby of Geashill. They had two sons and three daughters: Charlotte Henrietta Beresford (died 1884), Mary Emily Beresford (died 1858), George De la Poer Beresford (1831–1906) and Major Henry Marcus Beresford (1835–1895).

Beresford's first wife died in 1845, and on 6 June 1850 he married secondly Elizabeth, daughter of James Trail-Kennedy of Annadale, County Down and the widow of Robert George Bonford of Rahenstown, County Meath. There is a memorial to Elizabeth in the south aisle at St Patrick's Cathedral, Armagh.

== Sources ==
Falkiner, Cæsar Litton (1901). "Beresford, Marcus Gervais" . In Lee, Sidney (ed.). Dictionary of National Biography (1st supplement). London: Smith, Elder & Co.

Church of Ireland titles
Preceded by John Powell Leslie	Bishop of Kilmore, Elphin and Ardagh; 1854–1862	Succeeded by Hamilton Verschoyle
Preceded by Lord John Beresford	Archbishop of Armagh; 1862–1885	Succeeded by Robert Knox
