= Hawkins-Whitshed baronets =

Extinct baronetcy in the Baronetage of the United Kingdom

The Hawkins-Whitshed Baronetcy, of Killincarrick in the County of Wicklow and of Jobstown in the County of Dublin, was a title in the Baronetage of the United Kingdom. It was created on 16 May 1834 for Admiral Sir James Hawkins-Whitshed, and became extinct on the death of the 3rd Baronet in 1871.

Elizabeth Hawkins-Whitshed, daughter of the 3rd Baronet, was a mountaineering pioneer.

== Hawkins-Whitshed baronets, of Killincarrick and Jobstown (1834) ==
- Sir James Hawkins-Whitshed, 1st Baronet (1762–1849)
- Sir St Vincent Keene Hawkins-Whitshed, 2nd Baronet (1801–1870)
- Sir St Vincent Bentinck Hawkins-Whitshed, 3rd Baronet (1837–1871)

Coat of arms of Hawkey-Whitshead of Killincarrick
Crest 1st, A demi-lion, per pale, indented, Argent and Gules, holding in the dexter paw a trefoil, slipped Vert (Whitshed); 2nd, A falcon rising Proper, belled Or, perched on a lure Gold with the motto 'Providence with adventure' above (Hawkins). Escutcheon Quarterly, 1st and 4th: per pale indented, Argent and Vert, three demi-lions ; those in chief, the dexter Gules, the sinister Or, and that in base per pale indented, Gules and Or (Whitshed); 2nd and 3rd: per chevron, Argent and Vert, three hinds Proper (Hawkins) Supporters Dexter: a lion, per pale, indented, Gules and Argent, gorged with a ribbon of the Last, fimbriated Azure, therefrom pendent a representation of the Gold medal (presented to the admiral for his distinguished services off Cape St. Vincent), the dexter fore-paw resting on an anchor Proper ; sinister: a hind Proper, gorged as the dexter, in the mouth a trefoil slipped Vert. Motto Libertas et natale solum

Baronetage of the United Kingdom
Preceded by Tierney baronets	Hawkins-Whitshed baronets of Killincarrick and Jobstown; 16 May 1834	Succeeded by Hammick baronets
