= John Madden (priest) =

Dean of Kilmore from 1734 to 1751

John Madden was Dean of Kilmore from 1734 to 1751.

He was a Fellow of Trinity College, Dublin, Vicar of St Ann, Dublin and died on 7 November 1751.

Church of Ireland titles
Preceded by Jeremiah Marsh	Dean of Kilmore; 1734– 1751	Succeeded by Henry Maxwell
