= Jeremiah Marsh =

Irish dean (??–??)

Jeremiah Marsh was Dean of Kilmore from 1700 to 1734.

He was the son of Francis Marsh, Archbishop of Dublin from 1682 to 1693, and was educated at Trinity College, Dublin. He was instituted Dean on 24 December 1700. He also held the Treasurership of St Patrick's Cathedral, Dublin. Despite the strong recommendation of William King, Archbishop of Dublin he never became a bishop. He died on 3 June 1734 and was buried at St. Peter, Dublin.

Church of Ireland titles
Preceded by Richard Reader	Dean of Kilmore; 1700– 1734	Succeeded by John Madden
