= Richard Magenis (died 1831) =

Anglo-Irish politician (c.1763-1831)

Lt.-Col. Richard Magenis (c. 1763 – 6 March 1831) was an Anglo-Irish Unionist politician who sat in the Irish House of Commons and British House of Commons for Enniskillen.

Magenis represented Enniskillen in the Irish Parliament from 1790 to 1797. Following the Union of Great Britain and Ireland in 1801, he represented Enniskillen as a Tory from 26 October 1812 to 29 January 1828.

He was a Lieutenant-Colonel in the Fermanagh Militia.

Magenis, whose surname is also spelt Magennis or Maginnis, was Anglo-Irish gentry, member of Magenis of Finvoy Lodge. He was the eldest son of Richard Magenis and his second wife, Elizabeth Berkeley, daughter of Col. William Berkeley and sister of George Berkeley, Bishop of Cloyne. He was the elder brother of the Very Rev. William Magenis, Dean of Kilmore.

== Marriage and issue ==
Magenis married firstly, 1788, Lady Elizabeth Anne Cole (died 26 May 1807), daughter of William Cole, 1st Earl of Enniskillen and niece of Hon. Arthur Cole-Hamilton, with whom he represented Enniskillen. They had five sons and four daughters.

- Richard William Magenis, his heir
- William John Cole Magenis
- Lieut.-Col. Henry Arthur Magenis (July 1795 – 11 June 1828) of the 87th Royal Irish Fusiliers
- John Balfour Magenis (died 1862), married Frances Margaretta Moore, daughter of Judge Arthur Moore and Frances Stoney
- Sir Arthur Magenis GCB (c. 1801–1867), British diplomat
- Anne Louise Magenis (died 1855), married in 1821 David Albemarle Bertie Dewar
- Elizabeth Anne Magenis (died 1882), married James Wilmot Williams, of Heringston, Dorset
- Florence Sarah Magenis, died unmarried
- Florence Catherine Magenis (died 1837), married in 1821 John Ashley Warre

Magenis married secondly, Elizabeth Callander, widow of Col. George Dashwood, and daughter of James Callander Campbell, of Craigforth, a claimant of the Campbell baronetcy. With her he had a sixth son:

- Frederick Richard Magenis (1816–1866), died unmarried

Parliament of Ireland
| Preceded by James Stewart; John McClintock | Member of Parliament for Enniskillen; 1790–1797; With: Arthur Cole-Hamilton | Succeeded by Arthur Cole-Hamilton; Hon. Lowry Cole |
Parliament of the United Kingdom
| Preceded by Charles Pochin | Member of Parliament for Enniskillen; 1812–1828 | Succeeded by Arthur Henry Cole |
