= Enoch Reader =

Irish dean

Enoch Reader was an Irish Dean in the last decade of the 17th century and the first decade of the 18th.

A former Dean of Kilmore, Reader was Dean of Emly from 1700 until 1709.

Church of Ireland titles
Preceded by William Jephson	Dean of Kilmore; 1691–1700	Succeeded by Richard Reader
Preceded by Richard Reader	Dean of Emly; 1700–1709	Succeeded by John Wetherby
