= Henry Vesey-FitzGerald, 3rd Baron FitzGerald and Vesey =

Irish dean

Henry Vesey-FitzGerald, 3rd Baron FitzGerald and Vesey (19 December 1786 – 30 March 1860), was an Irish Dean in the middle of the 19th century.

Vesey-FitzGerald was born on 19 December 1786, the youngest son of James Fitzgerald and Catherine Vesey, created Baroness FitzGerald and Vesey in 1826. He was educated at Trinity College, Dublin.

He held incumbencies at Castlerahan, County Cavan and then Ballintemple, Cork. He was Dean of Emly from 1818 until 1825, when he became Dean of Kilmore, a position he held until his death on 30 March 1860 at Danesfort, County Cavan. He succeeded to the barony of FitzGerald and Vesey in 1843 following the death of his brother William Vesey-FitzGerald, 2nd Baron FitzGerald and Vesey; the title became extinct on his death.

Church of Ireland titles
Preceded by Richard Moore	Dean of Emly; 1818–1825	Succeeded by Thomas Le Fanu
Preceded by William Magenis	Dean of Kilmore; 1825–1860	Succeeded by Thomas Carson
Peerage of Ireland
Preceded by William Vesey-FitzGerald	Baron FitzGerald and Vesey; 1843–1860	Extinct
