= Richmond School =

Richmond School & Sixth Form College
- School Seal

Location
- Darlington Road; Richmond, North Yorkshire, DL10 7BQ; England; 54.406710°N 1.724630°W

Information
- Type: Academy
- Established: Unknown, records exist since 1361. Current establishment founded 1971. (precursors 1566, 1940, 1950)
- Founder: Elizabeth I
- Local authority: North Yorkshire
- Trust: Areté Learning Trust
- Department for Education URN: 145090 Tables
- Ofsted: Reports
- Head Mistress: Jenna Potter (soon retiring)
- Staff: 159
- Gender: Coeducational
- Age: 11 to 18
- Enrolment: 1,312
- School Seal: Latin: Sigillum Comune Libere Scole Burgensium de Richmond; Common seal of the free school of the town of Richmond
- Website: http://www.richmondschool.net/

Richmond School & Sixth Form College, often referred to simply as Richmond School, is a coeducational comprehensive secondary school with academy status, located in North Yorkshire, England. It was created by the merger of three schools, the oldest of which, Richmond Grammar School, is of such antiquity that its exact founding date is unknown. The first mentions of it in writings, however, is estimated, to be between 1361 and 1474. It was officially ratified as an educational establishment in 1568 by Elizabeth I.

The school is on the outskirts of Richmond, near the Yorkshire Dales. It accepts both boys and girls and serves a wide catchment area across most of the north-west corner of North Yorkshire, including Swaledale.

== History ==
=== Richmond Grammar School ===
Richmond School was the first school in Richmondshire. It accepted only boys and its only entry requirements were that pupils could read and write. Its date of foundation is not known, but it first appears in a registry believed to have been written between 1361 and 1474. It was awarded a charter ratifying its status on 14 March 1568 by Queen Elizabeth I and was one of the first free grammar schools in England. The school was built on what is now the churchyard of St Mary's Church, which stands opposite to and further up the hill to the former Richmond Lower School Building. In 1677 a new building replaced the Elizabethan one and this was used until 1850 when the school moved into a smaller building which still stands, and which until 2011 was used for teaching.

The name of the school from its foundation was Richmond School, as for many years it was the only school in the town. In later years it was referred to locally as "The Grammar School", although this was not its official name. Following the merger of the school with the Secondary Modern and the Girls' High School into a single comprehensive school the decision was made to retain the name "Richmond School" for the new establishment.

==== Notable heads ====
- Rev. Anthony Temple (1724–1795). Temple succeeded in getting 29 of his pupils admitted to Oxford and Cambridge.
- James Tate (1771–1843), Headmaster 1796–1833. Tate was even more successful; Richmond School become a nationally known school for classical learning. Tate sent up many scholars to Cambridge, where they became known as "Tate's invincibles". 21 became fellows, 13 of them at Trinity College.
- Thomas Henry Stokoe (1833–1903), Headmaster 1863–1871. Stokoe was a renowned clergyman and author.

The 1850 building with later extension

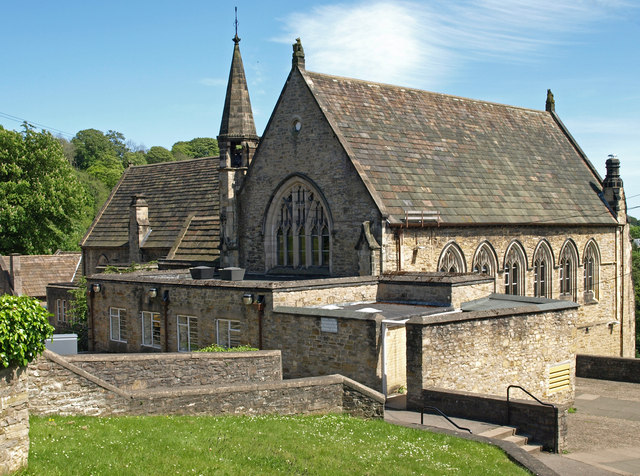
The 1850 building and subsequent extension in 2009, showing a flat-roofed extension built in the twentieth century. Another extension was built at the west end of the building at about the same time.

=== Richmond Girls’ High School ===
In 1940 a Girls’ High school was built, designed by Modernist architect Denis Clarke Hall. The school was built approximately 1 mile (1.6 km) from the Boys Grammar School near Darlington Road, having its main entrance in The Avenue.

=== Richmond Secondary Modern School ===
The former Secondary Modern Building. Photo taken in 2007

In 1950 Richmond Secondary Modern School was built to accommodate those who had not passed their 11-plus exam and so did not qualify for admission to either Richmond School or the Girls' High School. Large buildings were constructed about 200 yards from the Girls’ High School.

=== Comprehensive school ===
In 1971 all three schools merged to create a comprehensive school named Richmond School. The then-headmaster of the Grammar School, J.D. Dutton, became the headmaster of the new combined school. All three original sites were still used but for different purposes. The school was split into three sections: Lower School for Year 7, Middle School for Years 8–10 and Upper School for Years 11–13. These were situated in the former Richmond (Grammar) School, the former Secondary Modern School and the Girls’ High School respectively, although significant extensions were added to all sites until the school's investment as part of a DfES 'Building Schools for the Future' programme.

In January 2006 the school was successful in bidding for a DfES grant of £30 million to be spent redeveloping the school. A large factor that played a part in the grant was that Richmond is the only school in North Yorkshire to have sites which are 1 mile apart. In addition to the £30 million a successful bid was made to make the school sustainable. This brought the total investment to over £32 million. In 2009 it was announced that those entering the school in the academic year 2010–11 would be the last to use the original 1850 site (now called Lower School) in their first year in the school; all years would be taught at the same Darlington Road site and the Lower School would be sold off. The Lower School was later bought by North Yorkshire County Council in 2012 for £400,000 to be used as their new headquarters.

In February 2014, the Governing body of the school resigned en masse in response to North Yorkshire Education Authority issuing the school with a Warning Notice under the Education and Inspections Act 2006. In the resignation statement, the Full Governing Body rejected the assertions in the Warning Notice as unevidenced and contrary to the opinions expressed in Ofsted's recent inspection report. The Local Authority confirmed that measures were underway to appoint an Interim Executive Board.

=== Academy ===
Previously a community school administered by North Yorkshire County Council, in December 2017 Richmond School converted to academy status. The school is now sponsored by the Areté Learning Trust.

== School seal ==
The Elizabethan charter stated that Richmond Grammar School had the right to a "common seal for their businesses", and in 1566–67 a new seal for the school was introduced. The seal was still in existence in 1958.

In the centre of the seal was the figure of St James of Compostela. For several years Richmond Grammar School published an annual collection of poetry and prose writing by pupils in a small publication called "The Compostelian".

A description of the seal is given by L. P. Wenham: "The Central figure is that of St James the Greater in pilgrim's garb. His feet are bare, he has a bushy beard, wears a long, loose dress, has an escallop shell on his broad-brimmed hat, a strip or wallet hangs at his side from his girdle, his left hand holds a rosary and a small barrel or gourd, while in his right hand he carries a palmer's staff. At each side of him, upon Gothic shaped shields are the arms of France (new) and England quarterly; in the field are three lilies of France and two leopards of England."

The legend around the edge of the seal reads in Renaissance capitals:

SIGILLVM COMVNE LIBRE SCOLE BVRGENSIVM DE RICHMOND

SIGILLVM COMVNE translates as "the common seal", DE RICHMOND means "of Richmond", while LIBRE SCOLE BVRGENSIVM means "of the independent [free] school of the town".

The whole legend, in Elizabethan Latin, means in English "The common seal of the independent school of the town of Richmond".

== Sport ==
The Richmond Sixth Form Mixed Hockey Team after winning the National Sixth Form Hockey Championships in 2008

The school has a strong tradition of sport. Until 2003 male students at the Lower School had to perform a 1-mile run to and from playing fields at Easby. They also played rugby at Theakston Lane, now the ground of Richmond RFC. Nowadays, the school has several playing fields and pitches at its Darlington Road site. These include cricket pitches, several full-size football and rugby pitches, an all-weather AstroTurf pitch and a large grass athletics track which is locally known as "Wembley" as its dimensions are so close to those of the famous stadium. As part of the redevelopment of the school a large sports hall and gym were also constructed. The school allows the local community sports programmes to use its facilities out of term time and multiple training sessions take place at the site.

The school offers primarily a choice of rugby or football to boys and hockey and netball to girls as part of their compulsory education. However, the school offers multiple extra-curricular clubs and teams including athletics, golf, trampolining and cheerleading among others.

Sporting teams are popular including a mixed hockey team which won the national title in 2008. Rugby and football are also popular with various wins.

== Headmasters ==
=== Richmond Grammar School ===
- 1392–1393 Stephen Moys
- 1397–? Richard Forister
- 1436/7–? John Gardiner
- 1545–1548 John More
- 1577–? John Clarkson (Trinity College, Cambridge)
- 1608–1612 Richard Bland
- 1612–1613 Thomas Thompson
- 1613–1617 William Lambert (St John's College, Cambridge)
- 1617–1618 Sander (or Alexander) Hutton
- 1618–1620 John Jackson (Christ's College, Cambridge)
- 1620–1629 John Bathurst
- 1629–1630/1 Samuel Picarde (St John's College, Cambridge)
- 1630/1–1639 John Beckwith
- 1639–1648 John Bathurst
- 1648–1696 John Parvinge (Sidney Sussex College, Cambridge)
- 1696–1722 William Thompson
- 1722–1750 Robert Close (St John's College, Cambridge)
- 1750–1795 Anthony Temple (Sidney Sussex College, Cambridge)
- 1796–1833 James Tate I (Sidney Sussex College, Cambridge)
- 1833–1863 James Tate II (Trinity College, Cambridge)
- 1863–1871 Thomas Henry Stokoe (Lincoln College, Oxford)
- 1871–1884 James Snowden (St John's College, Cambridge)
- 1884–1890 Jean Rougier Cobu (Jesus College, Oxford)
- 1890–1895 Alfred Edward Rubie (Brasenose College, Oxford)
- 1895–1903 Douglas Rucker Smith (Queen's College, Oxford)
- 1903–1906 John Monteith Furness (King's College, Cambridge)
- 1906–1913 Algernon Richard Prestwich (Selwyn College, Cambridge)
- 1913–1919 Hago Sharpley (Corpus Christi College, Oxford)
- 1919–-1928 Thomas Charles Martin (Birkbeck, London)
- 1928–1950 Frank Charles Thackeray Woodhead (Hertford College, Oxford)
- 1950–1953 Thomas Gordon Charles Woodford (St Edmund Hall, Oxford)
- 1954–1959 Donald Alfred Frith (Christ's College, Cambridge)
- 1959–1962 Robert Dacres Baynes (Trinity College, Cambridge)

=== Richmond School ===
- 1962–1991 J. Derek Dutton
- 1991–1992 J. A. Lynch
- 1992–2002 Jim Jack
- 2002–2009 Phil Beever
- 2010–2017 Ian Robertson
- 2018– Jenna Potter

== Notable former pupils ==
Richmond Grammar School

- Michael Blackburn, British poet
- Thomas Chapman, Master of Magdalen College, Oxford
- William Wyatt Dimond, actor
- Marcus Gervais Beresford (1801–1885), Archbishop of Armagh
- Lewis Carroll (Charles Lutwidge Dodgson) (1844–46), writer
- Thomas Harrison, architect

Richmond Girls’ High School

- Brenda Hale, Baroness Hale of Richmond, DBE, QC, PC, FBA (Hon) (Born 1945), Justice of the Supreme Court of the United Kingdom

Richmond School

- Amanda Sonia Berry, CEO of BAFTA
- Fran Summers, British model
- Joanne Jackson (1997–2002), British Olympic swimmer
- Nicola Jackson, British Olympic swimmer
- Calum Clark (2000–2005), England U-20 international rugby player
- Simon Farnaby, Actor, writer, and comedian
- Alison Mowbray, British Olympic silver medal winner in quadruple scull (Athens 2004)
- Joshua Coburn, professional footballer

== See also ==
- Listed buildings in Richmond, North Yorkshire

== Literature ==
- Wenham, Leslie P. (1958). The History of Richmond School, Yorkshire. The Herald Press. ASIN B0018H5RA2.
- Animal Farm Programme. Richmond School. 2005.
- Bugsy Malone Programme. Richmond School. 2004.
- A Funny Thing Happened On The Way To The Forum Programme. Richmond School. 2007.
