= James Hawkins-Whitshed =

Royal Navy officer (1762–1849)

Admiral of the Fleet Sir James Hawkins-Whitshed Bt GCB
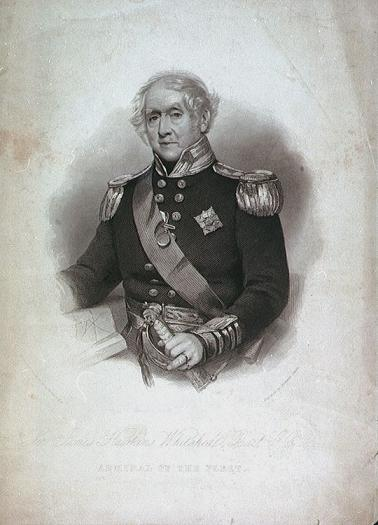
- c. 1820 portrait
- Born: James Hawkins; 1762; Raphoe, Ireland
- Died: 28 October 1849 (aged 86–87); London, England
- Military career
- Allegiance: United Kingdom
- Branch: Royal Navy
- Service years: 1775–1824
- Rank: Admiral of the Fleet
- Commands: HMS St Vincent; HMS Deal Castle; HMS Ceres; HMS Rose; HMS Arrogant; HMS Namur; HMS Ajax; HMS Formidable; Irish Sea Fencibles; Cork Station; Commander-in-Chief, Portsmouth
- Conflicts: American Revolutionary War; French Revolutionary Wars; Napoleonic Wars

Admiral of the Fleet Sir James Hawkins-Whitshed, 1st Baronet, GCB (1762 – 28 October 1849) was a Royal Navy officer. He saw action in command of a sloop at the Battle of Martinique during the American Revolutionary War. He went on to serve under Sir John Jervis in the Mediterranean and took part in the battle of Cape St. Vincent during the French Revolutionary Wars.

After promotion to flag-officer rank Hawkins-Whitshed became Commander-in-Chief of the Sea Fencibles in Ireland and then Commander-in-Chief of the Cork Station during the Napoleonic Wars. After the War with France was won he served as Commander-in-Chief, Portsmouth.

== Early life ==
Hawkins was born simply James Hawkins in Raphoe, County Donegal, in Ulster, the third son of The Rt Rev. Dr James Hawkins, Church of Ireland Lord Bishop of Raphoe, and his wife, Catherine Keene Hawkins. His name was carried on the muster roll of the sloop HMS Ranger on the Irish Station in 1773, and on that of HMS Kent, the guard ship at Plymouth, the next year.

== American War ==
The first ship in which Hawkins actually served at sea was the 20-gun sixth-rate HMS Aldborough, commanded by Captain William Bennett, whom he accompanied to Newfoundland in 1775. He afterwards served under Sampson Edwards in the schooner Canada, and after the loss of that vessel, returned to England with Admiral Robert Duff in HMS Romney. He was then assigned to the frigate HMS Diamond, under Captain Charles Fielding. In May 1776, Diamond escorted a convoy carrying a large detachment of British and foreign troops to America. In 1778, Hawkins served for a time as a lieutenant in HMS Rainbow, under Captain Sir George Collier, and after being confirmed in his rank by Lord Howe on 4 September 1778. On his arrival back in England he was appointed to the frigate HMS Amazon, where he remained until the end of 1779. He then served aboard the 90-gun ship HMS Sandwich, the flagship of Admiral Sir George Rodney. Hawkins consequently saw action in the capture of the Caracas Company convoy on 8 January 1780, and the "Moonlight Battle" on 16 January, when Rodney defeated a Spanish squadron under Don Juan de Lángara off the southern coast of Portugal.

Hawkins was promoted to commander on 10 February 1780, and given command of the 14-gun sloop HMS St Vincent (formerly the Spanish San Vicente of the Caracas Company) and sailed with Rodney from Gibraltar to the West Indies, seeing action again in the Battle of Martinique on 17 April 1780. On the day after the battle, on 18 April, he was promoted to captain and given command of the 20-gun frigate HMS Deal Castle. Deal Castle and the sloop-of-war HMS Chameleon were anchored in Gros Islet Bay, Saint Lucia, when in early October 1780 the "Great Hurricane" struck the island. The two ships made for the relative safety of the open sea, but Deal Castle was wrecked on the coast of Puerto Rico. Three of the crew were killed, but the rest escaped on rafts to the safety of the land. They were promptly imprisoned by the Spanish, and held for two months, before being released and sent to Tortola. Hawkins made his way to St. Eustatia, where he found Admiral Rodney. Having passed the ordeal of a court-martial for the loss of his ship, he returned to England in a packet with despatches from the Admiral.

Hawkins was appointed to command of the newly built 32-gun fifth-rate HMS Ceres at Liverpool in July 1781. Ceres returned to America in May 1782, conveying Sir Guy Carleton, the new Commander-in-Chief, North America to his command. Ceres remained in America until its final evacuation in December 1783, when Hawkins returned to England, where in February 1784, Ceres was paid off. After a short stay on shore, Hawkins took command of HMS Rose, which had been intended for the Mediterranean, but was subsequently sent to Leith, Scotland, where she remained till 1785, before being put out of commission. Hawkins took advantage of the peace to attend lectures in astronomy at the University of Oxford in 1786, and travelled extensively throughout Europe, visiting The Hague, Hamburg, Lübeck, Reval, Saint Petersburg, Copenhagen, and Paris.

In 1791, following the provisions of a will of his cousin James Whitshed, Hawkins added the surname of his maternal grandmother, Whitshed, to his own, in order to inherit properties that had once belonged to the Lord Chief Justice of Ireland William Whitshed. On 11 December 1791 Hawkins-Whitshed married Countess Sophia Henrietta Bentinck, the daughter of Captain John Bentinck.

== War with France ==
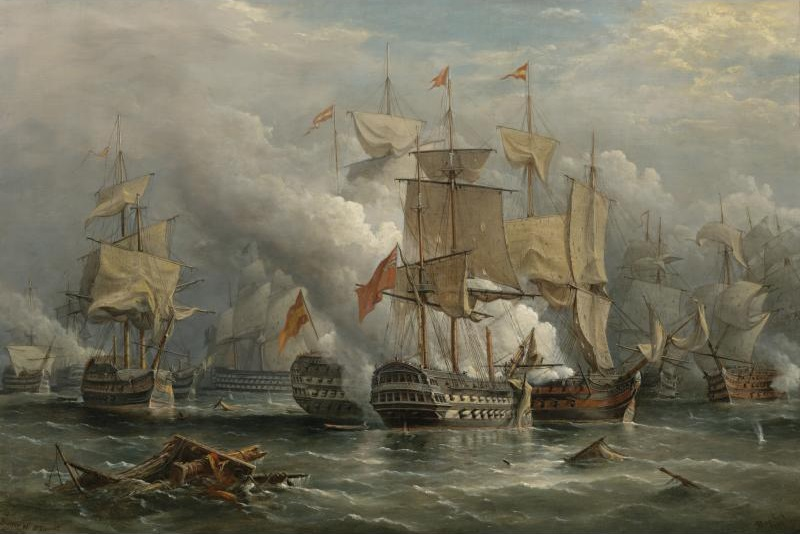
Hawkins-Whitshed commanded the second-rate HMS Namur during the battle of Cape St. Vincent

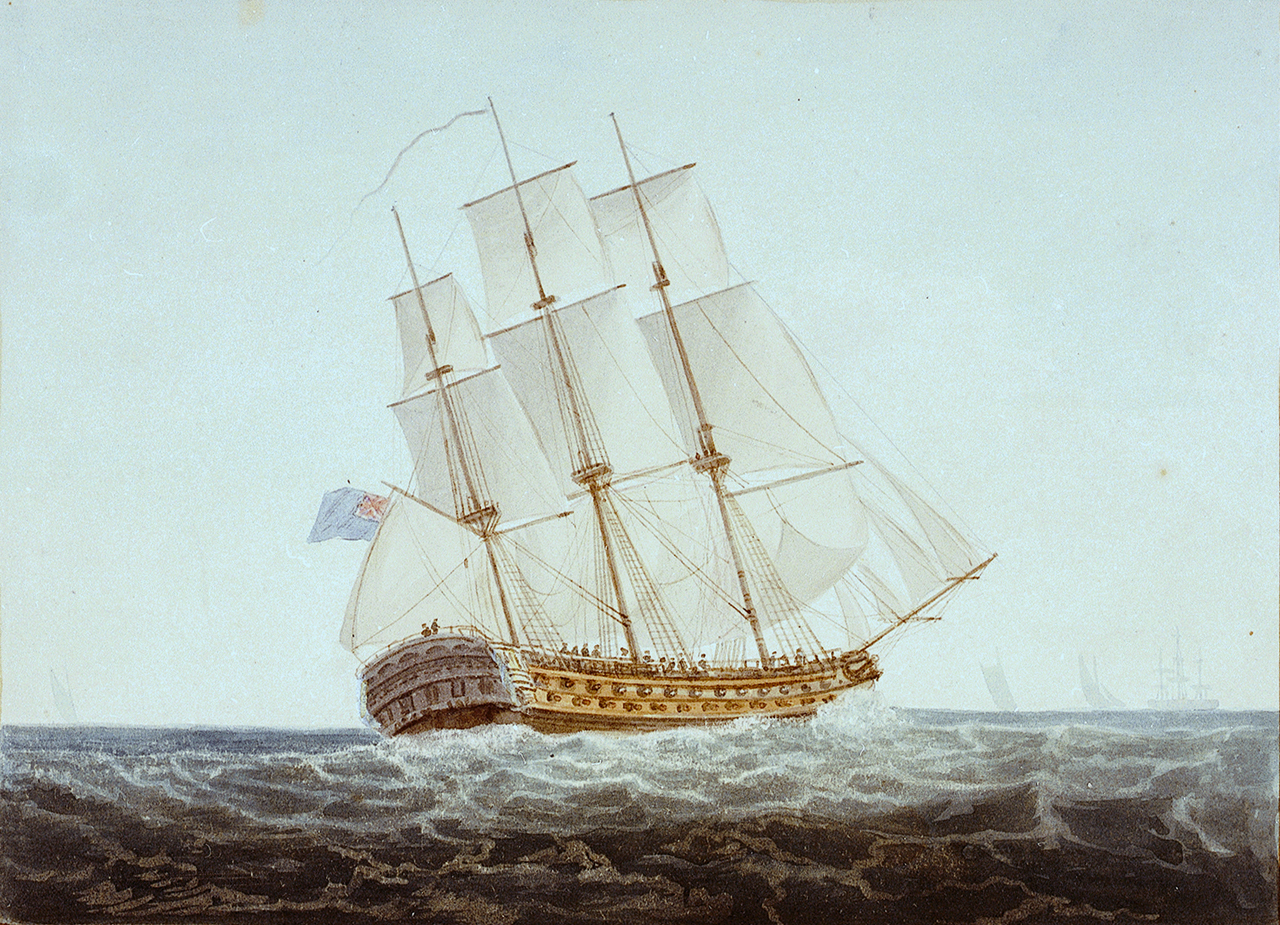
The 80-gun ship HMS Ajax, which Hawkins-Whitshed commanded later in the War with France

In June 1793, after the outbreak of war with Revolutionary France, Hawkins-Whitshed was appointed to command of the 74-gun ship HMS Arrogant, on the home station. In March 1795, he moved to the 90-gun second-rate ship of the line HMS Namur, and after cruising for some time with the Channel Fleet, sailed with Rear Admiral William Parker to reinforce Sir John Jervis in the Mediterranean. On 14 February 1797, Hawkins-Whitshed took part in the battle of Cape St. Vincent, where Jervis gained a notable victory over a Spanish fleet. Hawkins-Whitshed, with the rest of the officers of the squadron, received the thanks of Parliament, and was presented with a gold medal. Hawkins-Whitshed returned to England, where in January 1798 he was appointed to the 80-gun ship HMS Ajax, but after only six months was transferred to the 98-gun HMS Formidable, in which he remained after his promotion to the rank of rear admiral on 14 February 1799.

== Senior command ==
Upon the death of Sir Charles Thompson in March 1799, Hawkins-Whitshed hoisted his flag on board the 110-gun first-rate ship HMS Queen Charlotte and sailed for the Mediterranean. He soon returned to England, with his flag in the second-rate HMS Temeraire, and joined the Channel Fleet in November 1799. He remained there until the temporary peace occasioned by the Treaty of Amiens in March 1802. On the recommencement of hostilities in May 1803, Hawkins-Whitshed was appointed Commander-in-Chief of the Sea Fencibles in Ireland, receiving promotion to the rank of vice admiral on 23 April 1804. Hawkins-Whitshed was present at the funeral of Lord Nelson in January 1806. In early 1807 he replaced Lord Gardner as Commander-in-Chief on the Cork Station, remaining there until late 1810. He was promoted to the rank of admiral on 31 July 1810.

On 2 January 1815 Hawkins-Whitshed was made a Knight Commander of the Order of the Bath (KCB), receiving the award from the Prince Regent at Carlton House, on 11 April 1815. In February 1821, following the sudden death of Sir George Campbell, he was appointed Commander-in-Chief, Portsmouth serving there until March 1824. On 17 November 1830 he was advanced to Knight Grand Cross of the Order of the Bath (GCB), receiving the award on 1 December 1830.

On 1 May 1834 Hawkins-Whitshed was made a baronet of the United Kingdom of Great Britain and Ireland, of Killincarrick, in the county of Wicklow, and of Jobstown, in the county of Dublin, and the heirs "male of his body lawfully begotten." He received promotion by seniority to the highest rank in the navy, Admiral of the Fleet, on 8 January 1844. Hawkins-Whitshed died at his home in Cavendish Square, London, on 28 October 1849.

== Family ==
Hawkins-Whitshed and his wife, Sophia, had two sons and four daughters. Their eldest son, James Hawkins-Whitshed (ca. 1795–1813) followed his father into the Royal Navy, but was killed while serving as a midshipman in HMS Berwick. Their second son, St. Vincent Keene Hawkins-Whitshed (1801–1870), succeeded his father as baronet.

== See also ==
- O'Byrne, William Richard (1849). "Whitshed, James Hawkins" . A Naval Biographical Dictionary . John Murray – via Wikisource.
- Hawkins-Whitshed baronets
- Elizabeth Hawkins-Whitshed
- HMS Whitshed (D77)

== Sources ==
- Hattendorf, John B. (2008). "Register of the Papers of Sir James Hawkins Whitshed" (PDF). Naval Historical Collection. Newport, Rhode Island: Naval War College. Archived from the original (PDF) on 26 March 2013.
- Heathcote, Tony (2002). The British Admirals of the Fleet 1734 – 1995. Pen & Sword. ISBN 0-85052-835-6.
- Marshall, John (1823). Royal Naval Biography : or Memoirs of the services of all the flag-officers, superannuated rear-admirals, retired-captains, post-captains and commanders, whose names appeared on the Admiralty list of sea officers at the commencement of the year 1760, or who have since been promoted; illustrated by a series of historical and explanatory notes. With copious addenda (PDF). London: Longman, Rees, Orme, Brown, and Green.

Military offices
Preceded by Lord Gardner	Commander-in-Chief, Cork Station; 1807–1810	Succeeded by Edward Thornbrough
Preceded by Sir George Campbell	Commander-in-Chief, Portsmouth; 1821–1824	Succeeded by Sir George Martin
Baronetage of the United Kingdom
New creation	Baronet (of Killincarrick and Jobstown); 1834–1849	Succeeded by St Vincent Hawkins-Whitshed
