= Henry Maxwell (bishop) =

Irish Anglican clergyman

The Most Reverend and Honourable Henry Maxwell D.D.
- Bishop of Meath
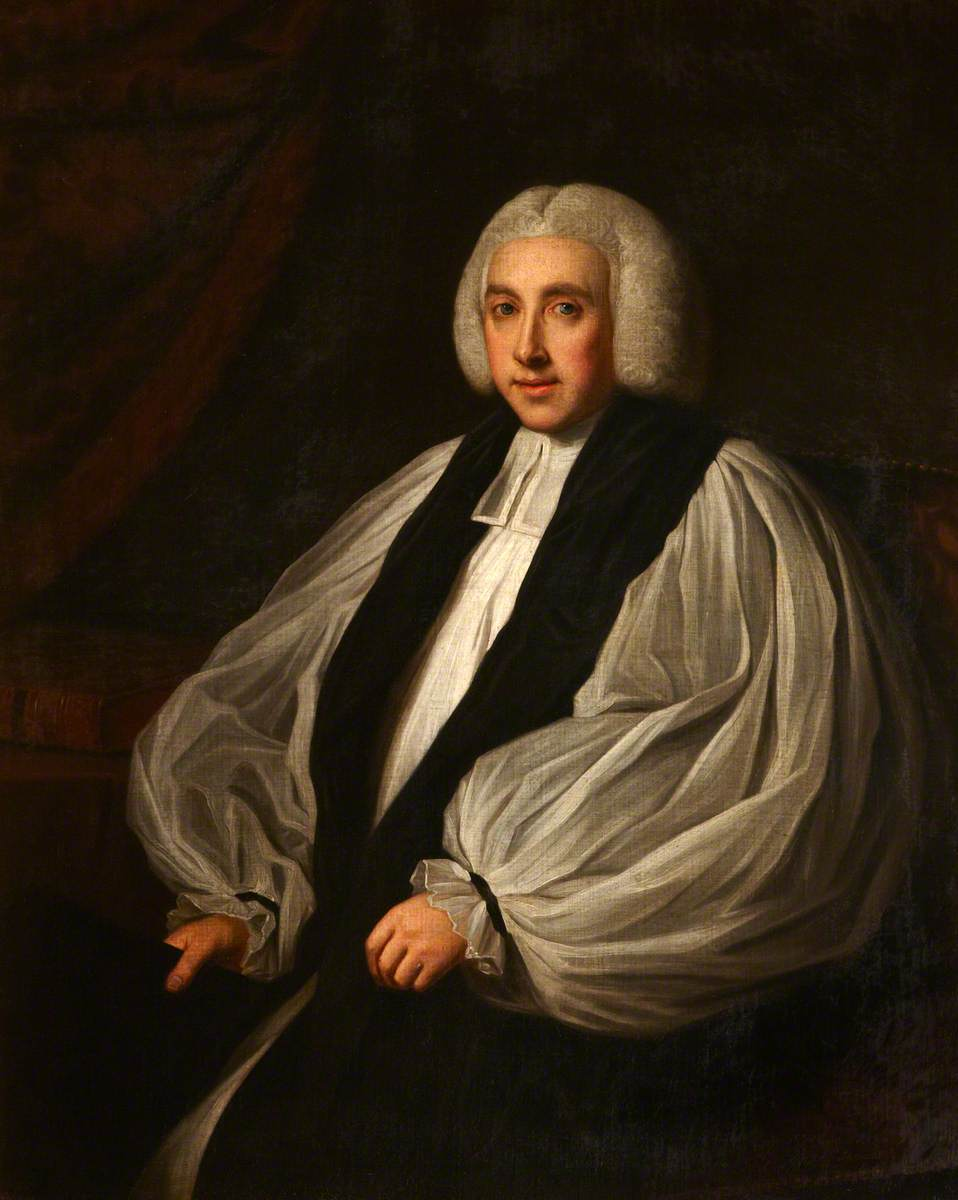
- Church: Church of Ireland
- Diocese: Meath
- Appointed: 15 April 1766
- Term ended: 7 October 1798
- Predecessor: Arthur Smyth
- Successor: Thomas Lewis O'Beirne
- Previous posts: Dean of Kilmore; Bishop of Dromore

Orders
- Ordination: 14 February 1748
- Consecration: 10 March 1765 by Richard Robinson

Personal details
- Born: circa 1723
- Died: 7 October 1798 (aged 75)
- Buried: Ardbraccan, County Meath
- Denomination: Anglican
- Parents: John Maxwell, 1st Baron Farnham and Judith Barry
- Spouse: Margaret Foster
- Children: John and Henry

Henry Maxwell, D.D. (c.1723–1798) was an Anglican clergyman who served in the Church of Ireland as the Dean of Kilmore, then Bishop of Dromore, and finally Bishop of Meath.

== Early life and family ==
He was the youngest son of John Maxwell, 1st Baron Farnham and Judith Barry. In 1759, he married Margaret Foster, daughter of the Rt. Hon. Anthony Foster, and sister of John Foster, 1st Baron Oriel. Their two sons, John and Henry, succeeded as the 5th and 6th Baron Farnham.

== Ecclesiastical career ==
He was ordained a priest in the Anglican ministry on 14 February 1748, and three years later instituted the Dean of Kilmore on 28 December 1751. He was nominated Bishop of Dromore by King George III on 8 February 1765 and appointed by letters patent on 5 March 1765. His consecration took place at St Michael's Church, Dublin on 10 March 1765, the principal consecrator was Archbishop Richard Robinson of Armagh, and the co-consecrators were Bishop Arthur Smyth of Meath and Bishop Jeremy Taylor of Down and Connor. The following year, he was translated by letters patent to the bishopric of Meath on 15 April 1766. He built the episcopal palace at Ardbraccan, and contributed liberally to the erection of the parish church. Having governed the see of Meath for thirty-two years, he died on 7 October 1798, aged 75, and was buried at Ardbraccan.

== Bibliography ==
- Cotton, Henry (1849). The Province of Ulster. Fasti Ecclesiae Hiberniae: The Succession of the Prelates and Members of the Cathedral Bodies of Ireland. Vol. 3. Dublin: Hodges and Smith.
- Fryde, E. B.; Greenway, D. E.; Porter, S.; Roy, I., eds. (1986). Handbook of British Chronology (3rd, reprinted 2003 ed.). Cambridge: Cambridge University Press. ISBN 0-521-56350-X.

Church of Ireland titles
| Preceded by John Madden | Dean of Kilmore; 1751–1765 | Succeeded by Charles Agar |
| Preceded by Edward Young | Bishop of Dromore; 1765–1766 | Succeeded by William Newcome |
| Preceded by Arthur Smyth | Bishop of Meath; 1766–1798 | Succeeded by Thomas Lewis O'Beirne |
