= Lord John Beresford =

Irish Anglican bishop (1773–1862)

The Right Reverend and Right Honourable Lord John Beresford PC (Ire)
- Archbishop of Armagh; Primate of All Ireland
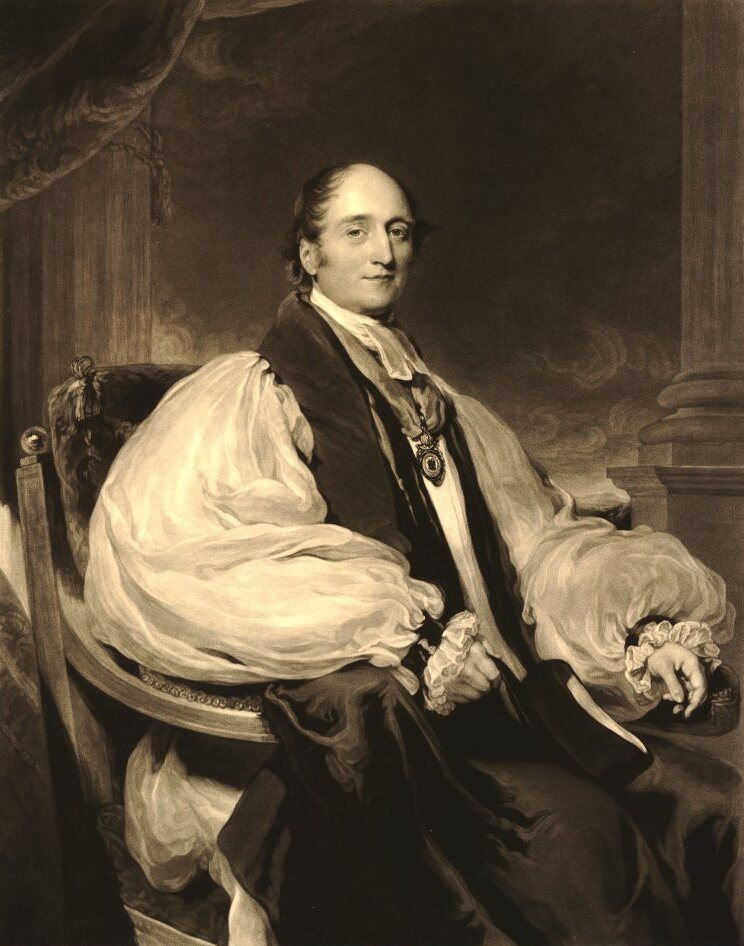
- Church: Church of Ireland
- See: Armagh
- Appointed: 17 June 1822
- In office: 1822–1862
- Predecessor: William Stuart
- Successor: Marcus Beresford
- Previous posts: Bishop of Cork and Ross (1805-1807); Bishop of Raphoe (1807-1819); Bishop of Clogher (1819-1820); Archbishop of Dublin (1820-1822)

Orders
- Ordination: 17 December 1797 by William Beresford
- Consecration: 29 March 1805 by Charles Brodrick

Personal details
- Born: 22 November 1773 Dublin, Kingdom of Ireland
- Died: 18 July 1862 (aged 88) Woburn, Bedfordshire, England
- Buried: St Patrick's Cathedral, Armagh
- Denomination: Anglican
- Education: Eton College; Christ Church, Oxford

Lord John George de la Poer Beresford PC (Ire) (22 November 1773 – 18 July 1862) was an Anglican archbishop and Primate.

== Background ==
Born at Tyrone House, Dublin, he was the second surviving son of George de La Poer Beresford, 1st Marquess of Waterford and his wife Elizabeth, only daughter of Henry Monck and maternal granddaughter of Henry Bentinck, 1st Duke of Portland. He attended Eton College and Christ Church, Oxford, where he graduated with a Bachelor of Arts in 1793 and a Master of Arts three years later.

== Career ==
Beresford was ordained a priest in 1797 and began his ecclesiastical career with incumbencies at Clonegal and Newtownlennan. In 1799 he became Dean of Clogher; and was raised to the episcopate as Bishop of Cork and Ross in 1805. He was translated becoming Bishop of Raphoe two years later and was appointed 90th Bishop of Clogher in 1819. Beresford was again translated to become Archbishop of Dublin in the next year and was sworn of the Privy Council of Ireland. In 1822, he went on to be the 106th Archbishop of Armagh and therefore also Primate of All Ireland. He became Prelate of the Order of St Patrick and Lord Almoner of Ireland. Having been vice-chancellor from 1829, he was appointed the 15th Chancellor of the University of Dublin in 1851, a post he held until his death in 1862.

== Restoration of St Patrick's Cathedral ==
Beresford employed Lewis Nockalls Cottingham, one of the most skilled architects at that time, to restore Armagh's St Patrick's Cathedral. Cottingham removed the old stunted spire and shored up the belfry stages while he re-built the piers and arches under it. The arcade walls which had fallen away as much as 21 inches from the perpendicular on the south side and 7 inches on the North side, were straightened by means of heated irons, and the clerestory windows which had long been concealed, were opened out, and filled with tracery.

Beresford is unsympathetically represented by Montalembert with whom he had breakfast at Gurteen de la Poer during his tour of Ireland.

Beresford died at Woburn, the home of his niece, in the parish of Donaghadee. There is a memorial to him in the south aisle at St Patrick's. His immediate successor as Archbishop was his first cousin once removed.

Church of Ireland titles
Preceded by Cadogan Keatinge	Dean of Clogher; 1799–1805	Succeeded by Richard Bagwell
Preceded by Thomas Stopford	Bishop of Cork and Ross; 1805–1807	Succeeded by Thomas St Lawrence
Preceded by James Hawkins	Bishop of Raphoe; 1807–1819	Succeeded by William Magee
Preceded by John Porter	Bishop of Clogher; 1819–1820	Succeeded by Percy Jocelyn
Preceded by Euseby Cleaver	Archbishop of Dublin; 1820–1822	Succeeded by William Magee
Preceded by William Stuart	Archbishop of Armagh; 1822–1862	Succeeded by Marcus Beresford
Academic offices
Preceded by Duke of Cumberland and Teviotdale	Chancellor of the University of Dublin; 1851–1862	Succeeded by 3rd Earl of Rosse
