= William Magee (archbishop of Dublin) =

Irish academic and bishop (1766–1831)

The Right Reverend and Right Honourable William Magee PC (Ire)
- Archbishop of Dublin; Bishop of Glendalough; Primate of Ireland
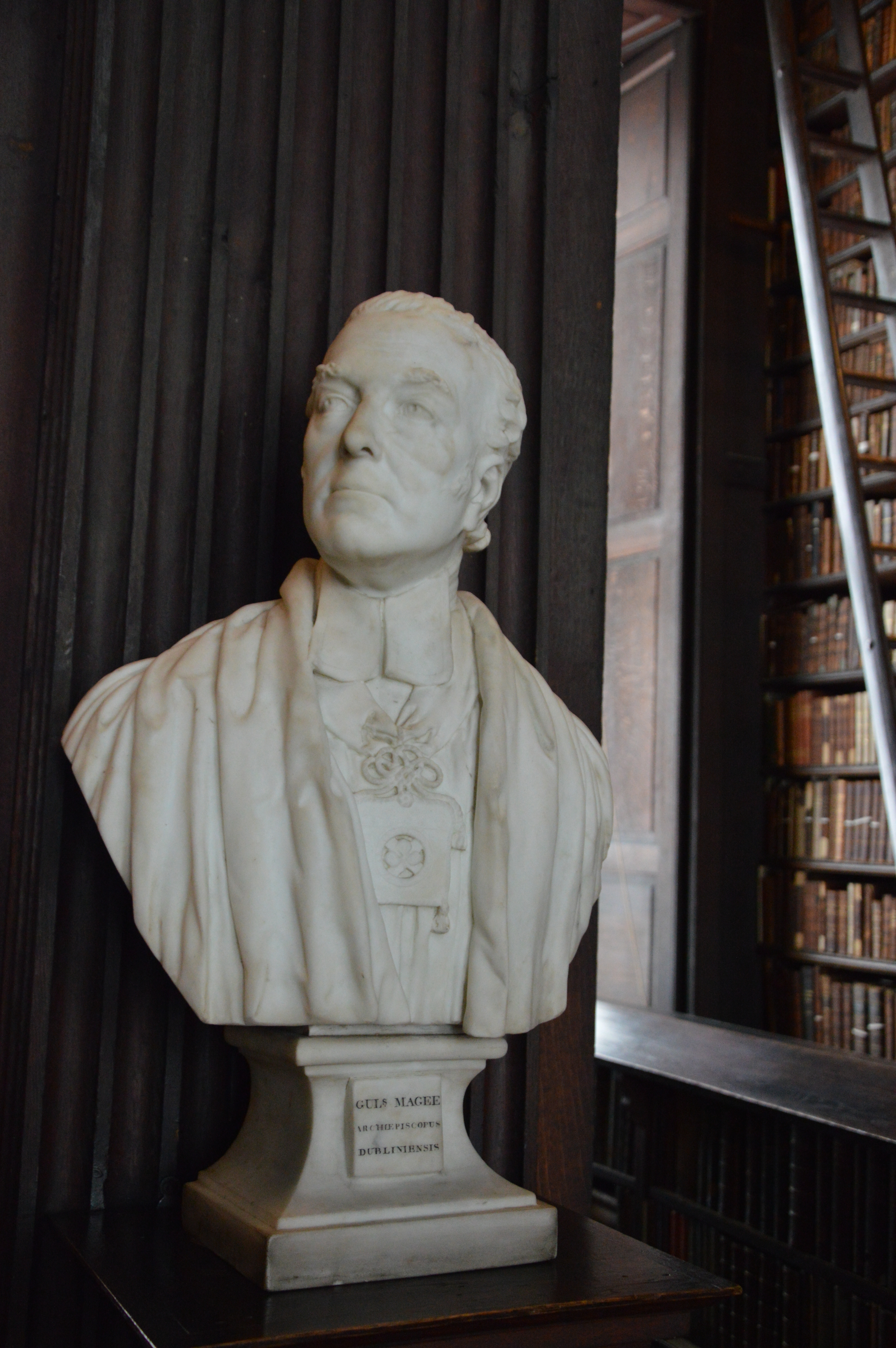
- Bust of William Magee in the Trinity College library
- Church: Church of Ireland
- Diocese: Dublin and Glendalough
- Appointed: 24 June 1822
- In office: 1822–1831
- Predecessor: Lord John Beresford
- Successor: Richard Whately
- Previous post: Bishop of Raphoe (1819–1822)

Orders
- Consecration: 24 October 1819 by William Stuart

Personal details
- Born: 18 March 1766 Enniskillen, County Fermanagh, Kingdom of Ireland
- Died: 18 August 1831 (aged 65) Stillorgan, County Dublin, Ireland
- Buried: St Patrick's Cathedral, Dublin
- Denomination: Anglican
- Parents: John Magee & Jane Glasgow

William Magee (18 March 1766 – 18 August 1831) was an Irish academic and Church of Ireland clergyman. He taught at Trinity College Dublin, serving as Erasmus Smith's Professor of Mathematics (1800–1811), was Bishop of Raphoe (1819–1822) and then Archbishop of Dublin until his death.

== Biography ==
He was born at Enniskillen, County Fermanagh, Ireland, the third son of farmer John Magee and Jane Glasgow. He was educated at Trinity College Dublin (BA 1786, MA 1789, BD 1797, DD 1801), where he had been a Scholar (1784), and was elected fellow in 1788. He was appointed Erasmus Smith Professor of Mathematics (and Senior Fellow) in 1800, and in 1813 was elected a Fellow of the Royal Society as a "gentleman of high distinction for mathematical & philosophical knowledge & Author of several works of importance". Thought not a research mathematician, he was a popular teacher at TCD and was well-liked by students.

He had been ordained into the Church of Ireland in 1790, and two of his sermons (preached in the college chapel in 1798 and 1799) formed the basis of his "Discourses on the Scriptural Doctrines of Atonement and Sacrifice" (1801), a polemic against Unitarian theology, which was answered by Lant Carpenter. In 1812 he resigned from TCD to undertake the charge of the livings of Cappagh, County Tyrone, and Killyleagh, County Down.

In 1813 he became Dean of Cork. He was well known as a preacher and promoter of the Irish Second Reformation, and in 1819 he was consecrated Bishop of Raphoe. In 1822 the Archbishop of Dublin was translated to Armagh, and Magee succeeded him at Dublin. Though in most respects a tolerant man, he steadily opposed the movement for Catholic Emancipation. He gained notoriety for prohibiting the Catholic inhabitants of Glendalough from celebrating Mass "as they had theretofore done in their ancient and venerated cathedral of St. Kevin".

He died on 18 August 1831 in Stillorgan, near Dublin. He had 16 children, of whom, 3 sons and 9 daughters survived him. He was the grandfather of Archbishop William Connor Magee of York.

Church of Ireland titles
Preceded by John George de la Poer Beresford	Archbishop of Dublin; 1822–1831	Succeeded by Richard Whately
