= Thomas Chapman (Master of Magdalene College) =

English academic and priest (1717–1760)

Thomas Chapman (1717–1760) was an English churchman and academic, Master of Magdalene College, Cambridge from 1746.

== Life ==
Chapman was born at Billingham, County Durham. He was educated at Richmond Grammar School in Yorkshire. He matriculated at Christ's College, Cambridge in 1734, graduating B.A. in 1738, and M.A. in 1741, obtaining a fellowship the same year.

In 1746 Chapman was appointed master of Magdalene College. He received the degree of LL.D. in 1748, when he served the office of vice-chancellor, and was appointed one of the king's chaplains. In 1749 he received the degree of D.D., and was appointed rector of Kirkby Overblow, Yorkshire. The following year he was appointed to a prebendal stall in Durham Cathedral, and in 1758 official to the dean and chapter. He died in 1760.

== Works ==
Chapman was the author of an Essay on the Roman Senate, 1750, translated into French in 1765.
