= Denis Browne (priest) =

Irish Dean

- Born: 1796; County Mayo, Ireland
- Died: 1864 (aged 67–68)
- Education: Trinity College Dublin
- Occupation: Dean of Emly

Denis Browne (1796–1864) was an Irish Dean in the middle of the 19th century.

Browne was born in County Mayo and educated at Trinity College, Dublin. He was for many years the incumbent at Enniscorthy. He was Dean of Emly from 1850 until his death. He was a close friend of John Gregg, Bishop of Cork, Cloyne and Ross from 1862 to 1878. His grandson was the man who buried the poet Rupert Brooke.
