= Peter Guinness =

Peter Guinness may refer to:

- Peter Guinness (actor) (born 1950), British actor and writer
- Peter Guinness (writer), British television writer
