= John McGuinness =

John McGuinness may refer to:

- John McGuinness (baseball) (1857–1916), Irish-born baseball player
- Seán McGuinness (died 1978), also known as John McGuinness, Irish republican politician
- John McGuinness (politician) (born 1955), Irish Fianna Fáil politician
- John McGuinness (bowls) (born 1967), English lawn bowler
- John McGuinness (motorcyclist) (born 1972), English professional motorcycle racer
