= Maria Razumovskaya =

Russian noblewoman

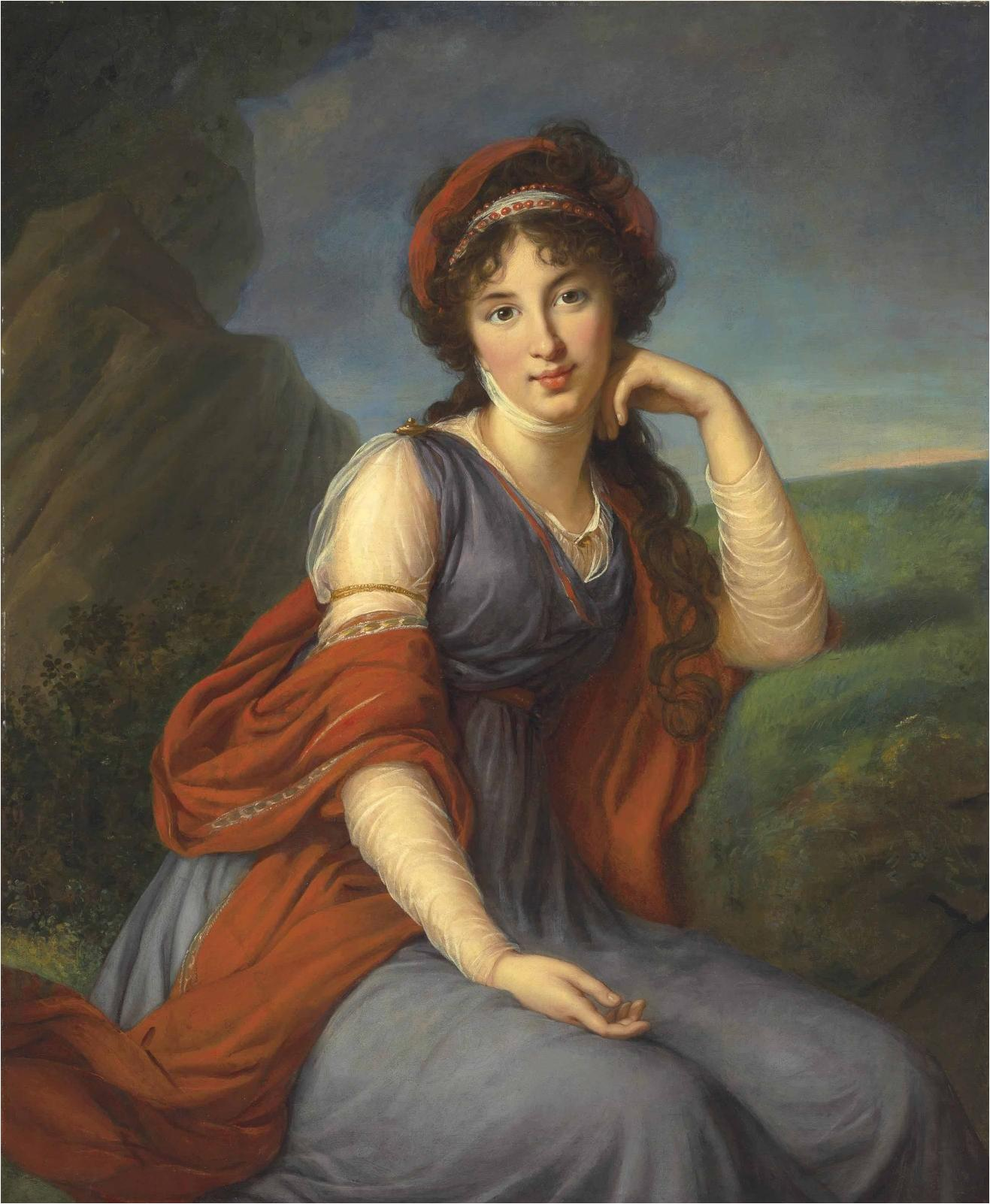
Maria Razumovskaya by Vigée-Lebrun, oil on canvas, 1798.

Maria Grigorievna Razumovskaya (10 April 1772 - 9 August 1865) was a Russian noblewoman and patron of the arts.

Her salon in St Petersburg was visited by Emperor Nicholas I and Empress Alexandra.
