= George Beresford (bishop) =

Irish Anglican bishop (1765–1841)

The Rt. Rev. George de la Poer Beresford (19 July 1765 – 16 October 1841) was an Irish bishop.

A member of the Beresford family headed by the Marquess of Waterford, Beresford was the son of the Hon. John Beresford, younger son of Marcus Beresford, 1st Earl of Tyrone. Marcus Beresford and John Claudius Beresford were his brothers.

He became Dean of Kilmore from 1797 to 1801, Bishop of Clonfert and Kilmacduagh between 1801 and 1802 and Bishop of Kilmore between 1802 and 1839. The latter year the Kilmore and Ardagh sees were united, and Beresford served as Bishop for the new see until his death two years later.

He married Frances Busche on March 26, 1794. His wife was the daughter of Gervase Parker Bushe and Mary Grattan (sister of Henry Grattan). They had several children, including John de la Poer Beresford, the Colonial Secretary of St Vincent, West Indies. His second son was Marcus Beresford, Archbishop of Armagh.

He additionally was a slaveowner and is listed as receiving £148 as compensation for 6 slaves during abolition.

He died in October 1841, aged 76. His wife survived him by two years and died in May 1843. His daughter Charlotte married into the Lumley family and was the mother of the ninth earl of Scarbrough.

Religious titles
Preceded by Matthew Young	Bishop of Clonfert and Kilmacduagh; 1801–1802	Succeeded by Nathaniel Alexander
Preceded by Charles Brodrick	Bishop of Kilmore; 1802–1839	United with See of Ardagh
New title	Bishop of Kilmore and Ardagh; 1839–1841	United with See of Elphin
