= James Hawkins (bishop) =

Irish bishop

James Hawkins was an Irish Anglican bishop in the 18th and 19th centuries.

A former Dean of Emly (1766–1775), Hawkins was the Bishop of Dromore from 1775 to 1780 and Bishop of Raphoe from then until his death on 23 June 1807.

== Family ==
He married Catherine, the daughter of Gilbert Keene and niece of William Whitshed; they had four sons and three daughters. His son James adopted the additional surname of Whitshed and was created first Baronet Whitshed-Hawkins. His son Thomas became Dean of Clonfert in 1812.

Church of Ireland titles
Preceded by William Newcome	Bishop of Dromore; 1775–1780	Succeeded by William Beresford
Preceded by John Oswald	Bishop of Raphoe; 1780–1807	Succeeded by John George de la Poer Beresford
