= Dean of Kilmore =

Church of Ireland official

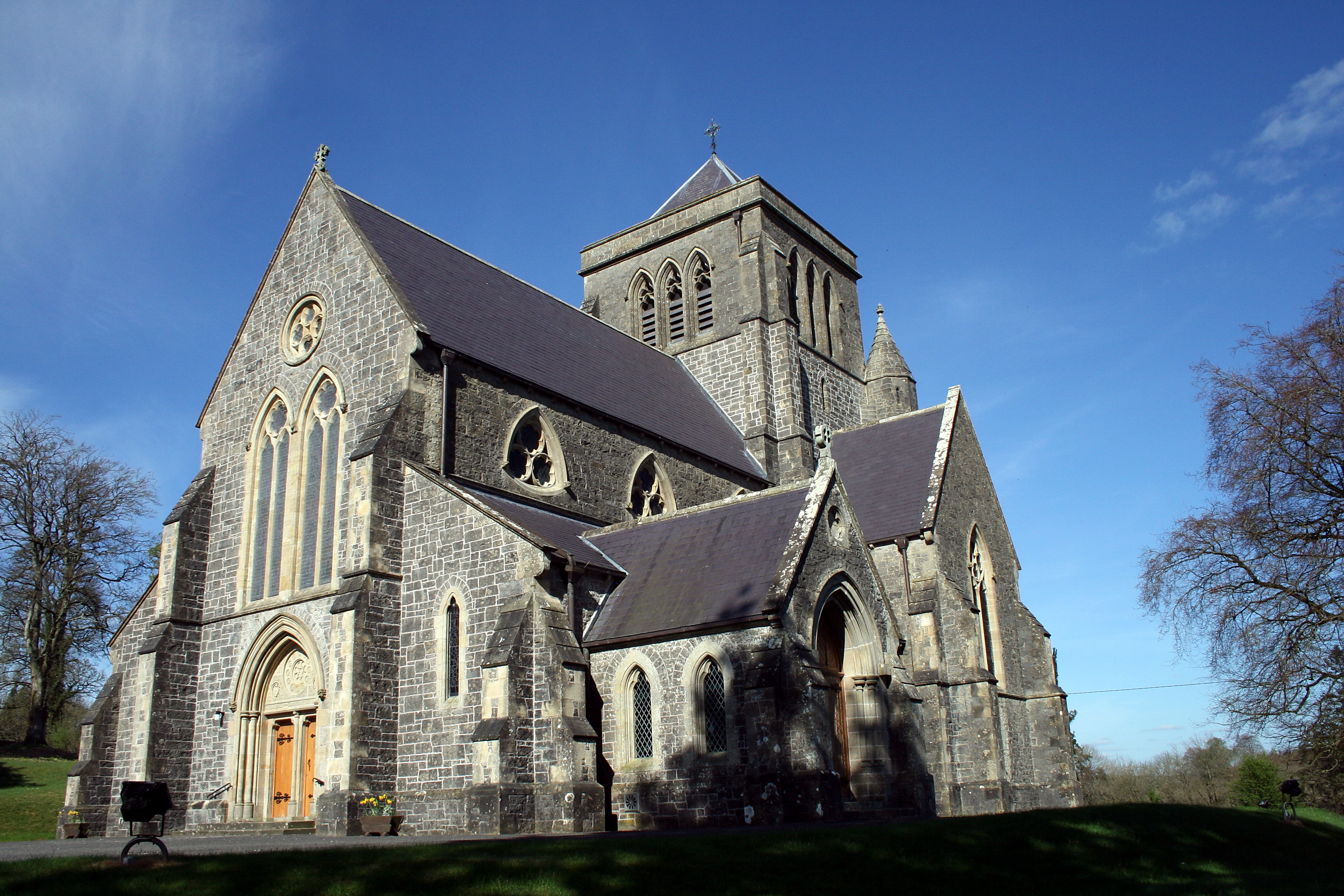
Kilmore Cathedral

The Dean of Kilmore is based at the Cathedral Church of St Fethlimidh in Kilmore in the Diocese of Kilmore within the united bishopric of Kilmore, Elphin and Ardagh. Prior to the 1841 amalgamation the cathedral was in the bishopric of Kilmore and Ardagh.

The current dean is the Very Reverend Nigel Crossey, former chaplain at St Columba's College.

== List of deans of Kilmore ==
- 1619–1627 John Hill
- 1627–1637 Nicholas Bernard (afterwards Dean of Ardagh)
- 1637–1645 Henry Jones (afterwards Bishop of Clogher 1645)
- 1645–? Lewis Downes
- 1664–? Edward Dixie
- ?1690 William Jephson
- 1691–1700 Enoch Reader (afterwards Dean of Emly 1700)
- 1700–1700 Richard Reader
- 1700–1734 Jeremiah William Marsh
- 1734–1751 John Madden
- 1751–1765 Hon Henry Maxwell (afterwards Bishop of Dromore 1765)
- 1765–1768 Charles Agar (afterwards Bishop of Cloyne 1768)
- 1768–1797 Thomas Webb
- 1797–1801 George de la Poer Beresford (afterwards Bishop of Clonfert and Kilmacduagh 1801)
- 1801–1825 William Magenis
- 1825–1860 Henry Vesey-Fitzgerald, 3rd Baron FitzGerald and Vesey
- 1860–1870 Thomas Carson (afterwards Bishop of Kilmore, Elphin and Ardagh 1870)
- 1872–? John Maunsell Massy-Beresford
- 1886–? William H. Stone
- 1913–? Isaac Coulter (died 1934)
- 1931–1955 William James Askins
- 1955-1984 Robert Christopher 'Howard' Turkington
- 1990–? Charles Combe
- 1997–2004 David Godfrey
- 2005–2014 Wallace Raymond Ferguson
- 2015–Present Nigel Crossey
