= List of sites on the National Register of Historic Parks and Gardens =

List managed by Historic England

This list of sites on the National Register of Historic Parks and Gardens is a list of parks and gardens in England featured on the Register of Historic Parks and Gardens of special historic interest in England. The list is managed by Historic England (formerly English Heritage), and currently includes about 1,600 sites.

As with listed buildings, parks and gardens are graded on a scale: Grade I being internationally significant sites; these are therefore the most important and constitute around 10% of the total number. Historically important gardens are Grade II* (about 30% of the total), and the remainder are of regional or national importance and are Grade II registered. As with listed buildings, Registered Parks and Gardens can be searched on the National Heritage List for England (NHLE) website.

Provided at the end of this page are those sites which were formerly listed, but have since been delisted.

== Lists by region ==
- Listed parks and gardens in the East Midlands
- Listed parks and gardens in the East of England
- Listed parks and gardens in Greater London
- Listed parks and gardens in North East England
- Listed parks and gardens in North West England
- Listed parks and gardens in South East England
- Listed parks and gardens in South West England
- Listed parks and gardens in the West Midlands
- Listed parks and gardens in Yorkshire and the Humber

== The sites (alphabetical) ==
=== Parks and gardens ===
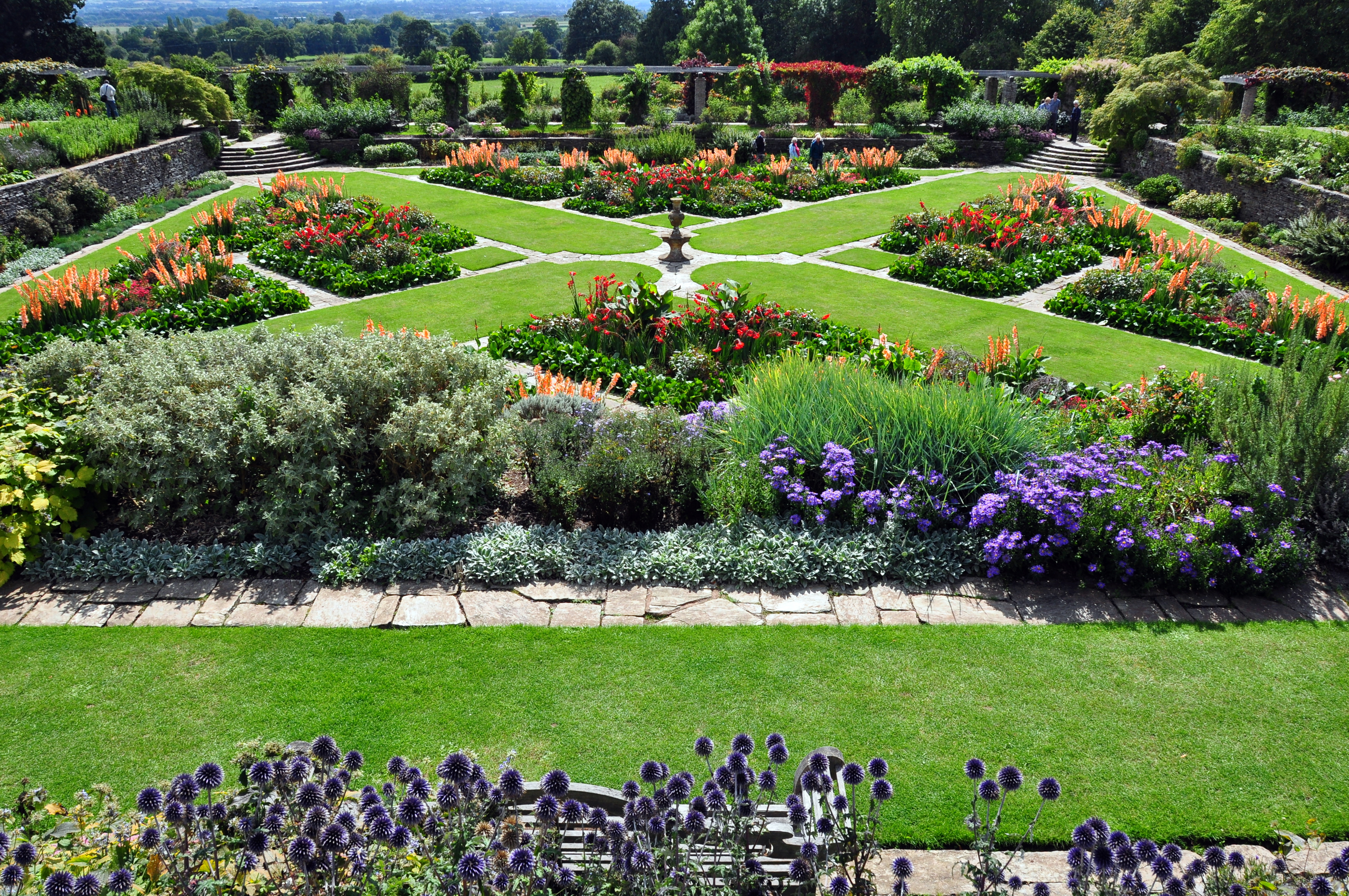
The Great Plait at Hestercombe is perhaps the most famous of the sites, laid out by Gertrude Jekyll and Edwin Lutyens between 1904 and 1906. It is listed Grade I, and is also a Site of Special Scientific Interest (SSSI)

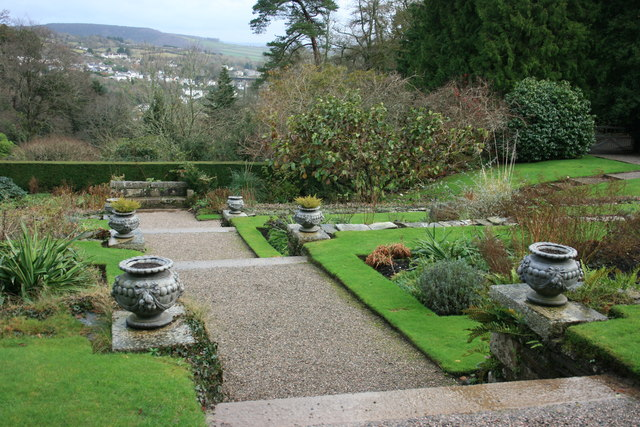
The terraced gardens at Cotehele, a Grade II* garden in Cornwall

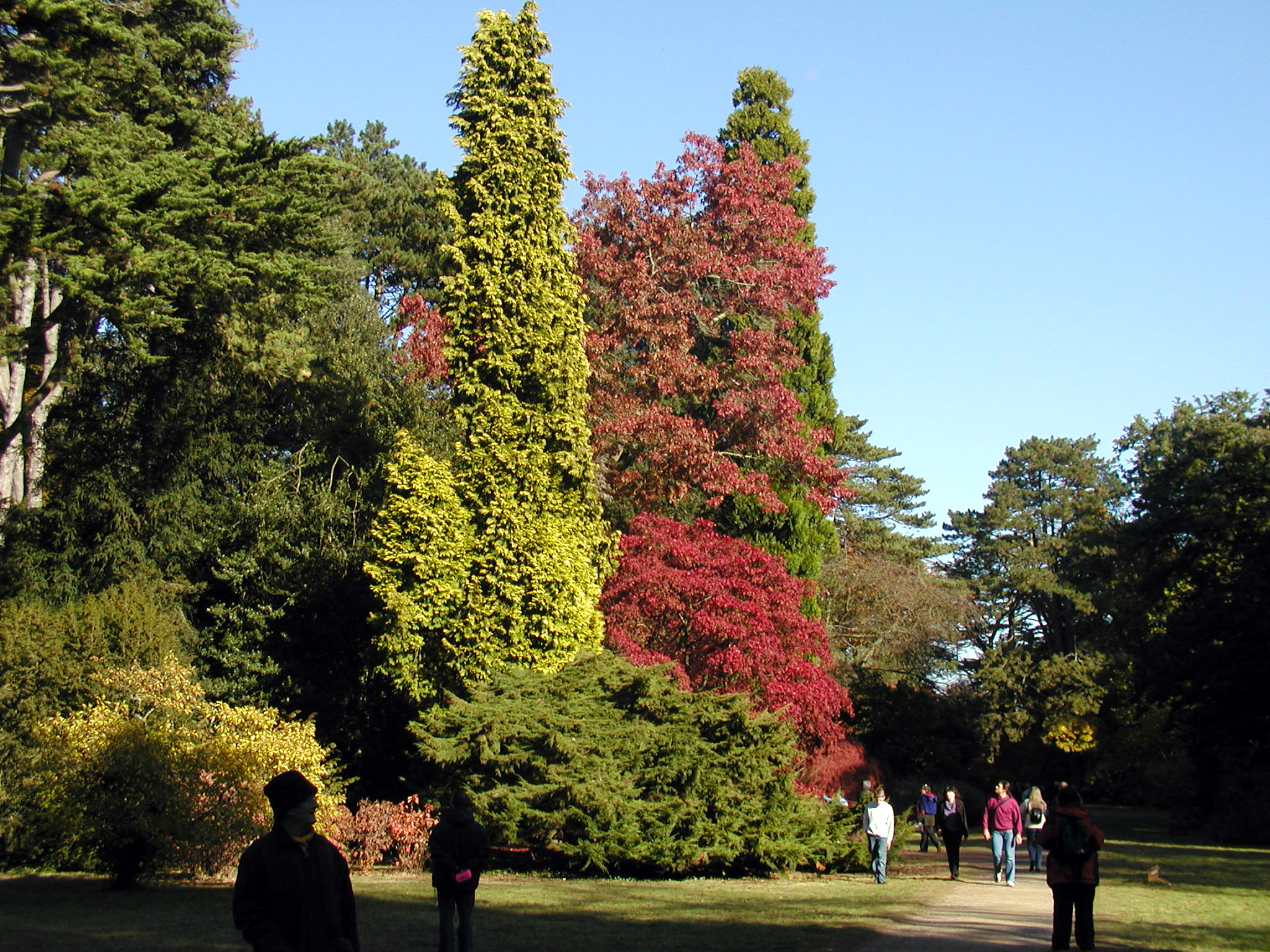
Westonbirt Arboretum is a Grade I arboretum in Gloucestershire

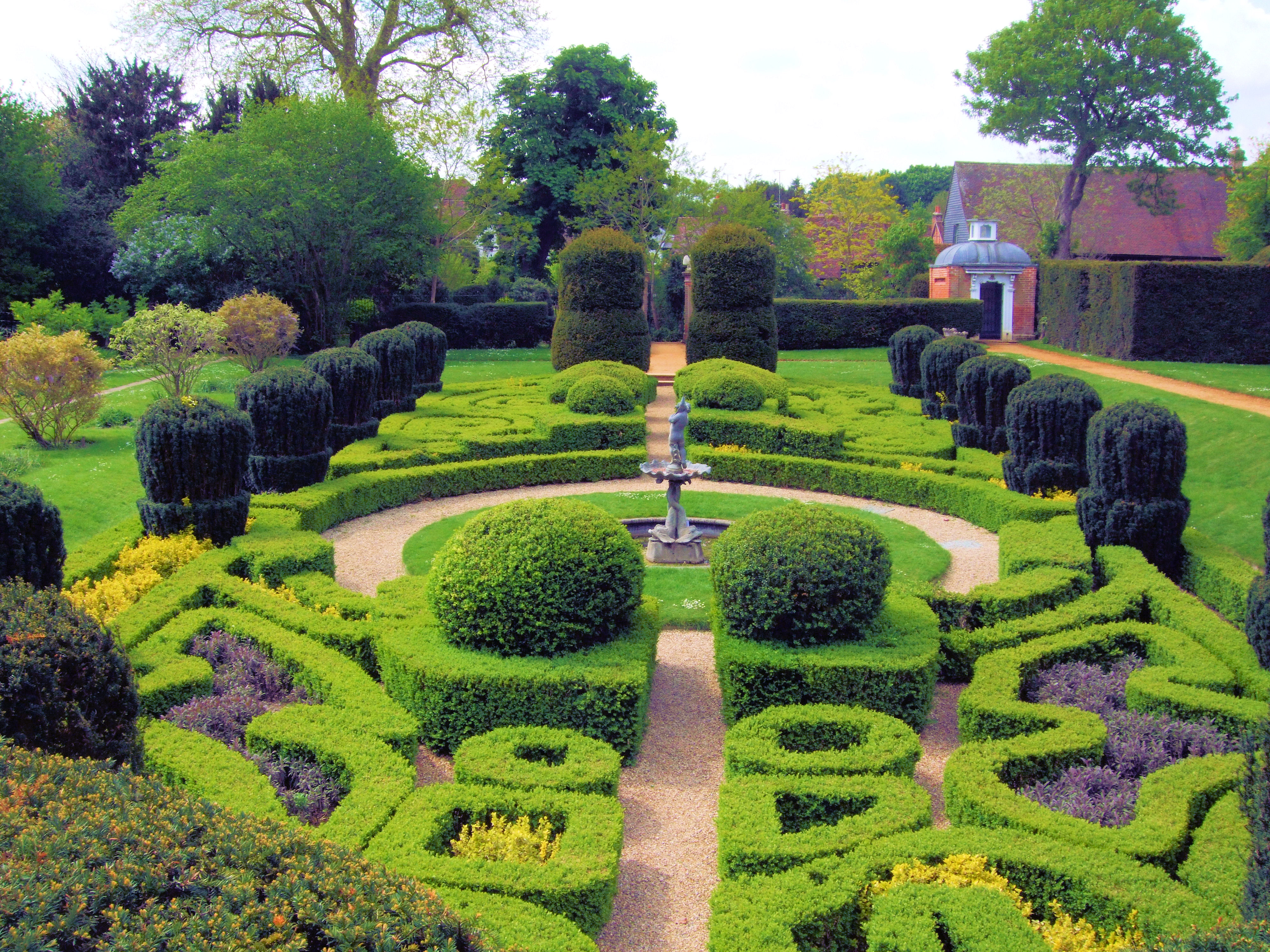
Bridge End Gardens, a Grade II* group of seven interlinked 19th-century gardens in Saffron Walden

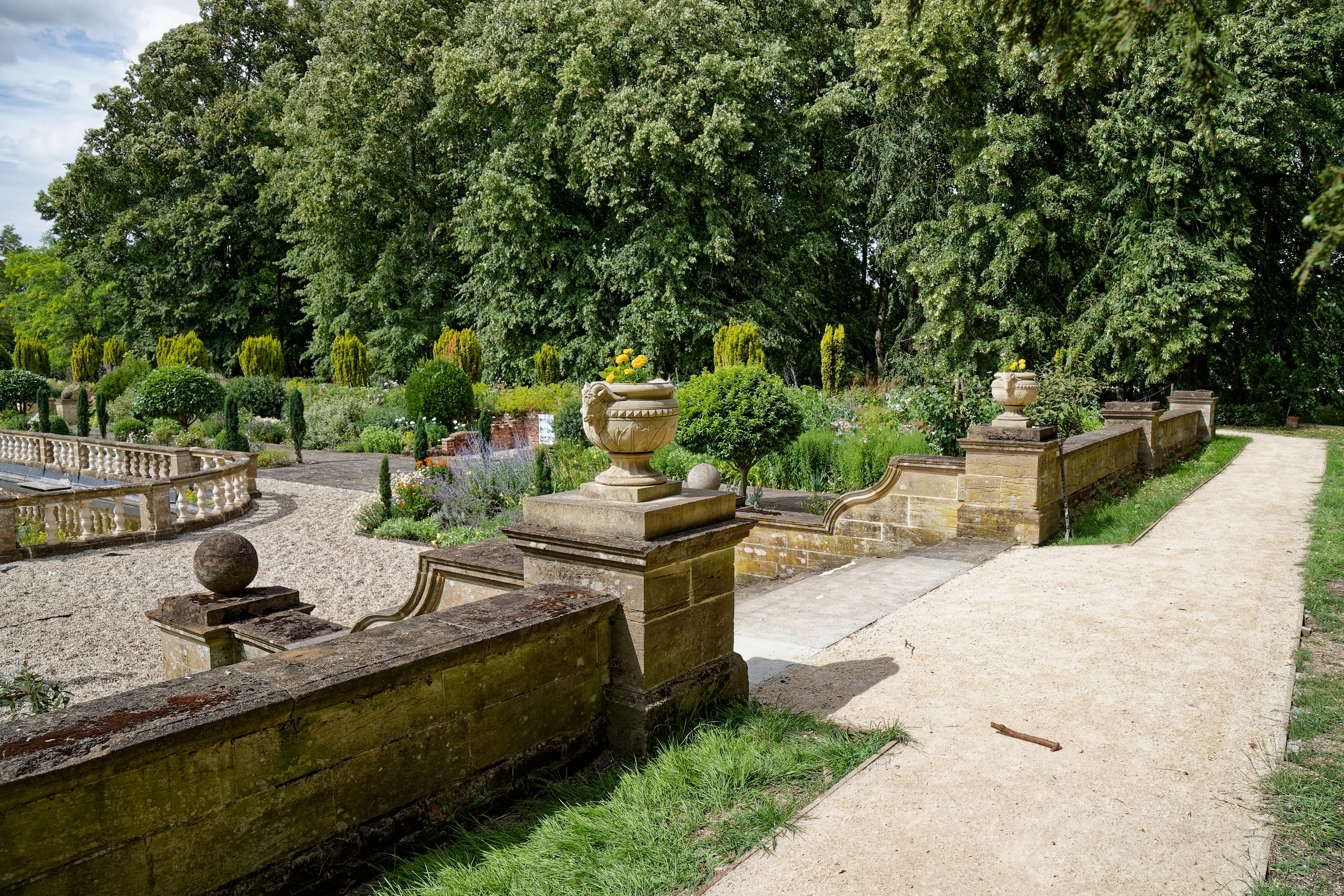
The sunken Italianate Garden, designed in 1902 by Harold Peto, in the Grade II Easton Lodge Gardens at Little Easton, Essex.

- A la Ronde, Devon – Grade II
- Abberley Hall, Worcestershire – Grade II
- Abbey Park, Leicester – Grade II*
- Addington Park, London – Grade II
- Alexandra Park, Manchester – Grade II
- Alton Towers, Staffordshire – Grade I
- Arley House, Worcestershire – Grade II
- Aston Hall, West Midlands – Grade II
- Athelhampton House & Gardens, Dorset — Grade I
- Badger Dingle, Shropshire – Grade II
- Bagthorpe Gardens, Nottingham – Grade II*
- Barrington Court, Somerset – Grade II*
- Barrow Park, Barrow-in-Furness – Grade II
- Bedford Park, Bedford – Grade II
- Belper River Gardens, Derbyshire – Grade II*
- Biddulph Grange, Staffordshire – Grade I
- Birmingham Botanical Gardens, West Midlands – Grade II*
- Borough Gardens, Dorchester – Grade II
- Boultham Park, Lincoln – Grade II
- Bridge End Gardens, Saffron Walden – Grade II*
- Broadway, Letchworth – Grade II
- Brunswick Park, Wednesbury, West Midlands – Grade II
- Burslem Park, Stoke-on-Trent – Grade II*
- Canons Park, London – Grade II
- Castle Bromwich Hall Gardens, West Midlands – Grade II*
- Castle Park, Frodsham, Cheshire – Grade II
- Catton Park, Norwich – Grade II*
- Caversham Court, Reading – Grade II
- Caversham Park, Reading – Grade II
- Chantry Park, Ipswich – Grade II (No.1000271)
- Charlecote Park, Warwickshire – Grade II*
- Chatsworth House, Derbyshire – Grade I
- Cholmondeley Castle, Cheshire – Grade II
- Clevedon Court, Somerset – Grade II*
- Cliveden, Buckinghamshire - Grade I
- Clumber Park, Nottinghamshire – Grade I
- Congleton Park, Cheshire – Grade II
- Corporation Park, Blackburn – Grade II
- Cotehele, Cornwall – Grade II*
- Cothelstone Manor, Somerset – Grade II
- The Courts Garden, Wiltshire – Grade II
- Crewe Hall, Cheshire – Grade II
- Croxteth Hall, Liverpool – Grade II
- Crystal Palace, London – Grade II
- Cumberland Lodge, Berkshire - Grade I
- Danbury Country Park, Essex – Grade II
- Dartmouth Park, West Bromwich – Grade II Grade II
- Derby Arboretum, Derby – Grade II*
- Derwent Gardens, Derbyshire – Grade II
- Dolphin Square, London – Grade II
- Dulwich Park, London – Grade II
- Dunorlan Park, Kent – Grade II
- East Lambrook Manor, Somerset – Grade I
- Easton Lodge Gardens, Essex – Grade II
- Eaton Hall, Cheshire – Grade II*
- Englefield House, Berkshire - Grade II
- Exbury Gardens, Hampshire - Grade II*
- Forbury Gardens, Reading – Grade II
- Frogmore, Berkshire - Grade I
- Gawsworth Old Hall, Cheshire – Grade II*
- Handsworth Park, West Midlands – Grade II
- Hanley Park, Stoke-on-Trent – Grade II*
- Hardwick Hall, Derbyshire – Grade I
- Hartsholme Country Park, Lincoln – Grade II
- Hawkstone Park, Shropshire – Grade I
- Hazlegrove House Park and Garden, Somerset - Grade II
- Hedsor House, Buckinghamshire – Grade II
- Heights of Abraham, Derbyshire – Grade II*
- Herstmonceux Castle, Sussex – Grade II*
- Hestercombe House, Somerset – Grade I
- Hill Close Gardens, Warwick – Grade II*
- Himley Hall, Staffordshire – Grade II
- Hodnet Hall, Shropshire – Grade II
- Holker Hall, Cumbria – Grade II
- Holwood House, London – Grade II
- Howard Park and Gardens, Letchworth – Grade II
- Howard Park, Glossop – Grade II
- Iford Manor, Wiltshire - Grade I
- Kelston Park, Somerset – Grade II*
- Kenilworth Castle, Warwickshire – Grade II*
- Knebworth House, Hertfordshire – Grade II*
- Kyre Park, Worcestershire – Grade II
- Larmer Tree Gardens, Wiltshire – Grade II*
- Layer Marney Tower, Essex – Grade II
- The Leasowes, West Midlands – Grade I
- Leonardslee, Sussex – Grade I
- Lincoln Arboretum, Lincoln – Grade II
- Locko Park, Derbyshire – Grade II
- Lost Gardens of Heligan, Cornwall – Grade II
- Lovers' Walks, Derbyshire – Grade II*
- Lowesby Hall, Leicestershire – Grade II
- Lyme Park, Cheshire – Grade II*
- Lytes Cary, Somerset – Grade II
- Maer Hall, Staffordshire – Grade II
- Marston House, Somerset – Grade II
- Mellor's Gardens, Cheshire – Grade II
- Milton Lodge, Somerset – Grade II
- Mote Park, Kent – Grade II
- Mount Edgcumbe House, Cornwall – Grade I
- Ness Botanic Gardens, Cheshire – Grade II
- Newsham Park, Liverpool – Grade II
- Nymans, West Sussex – Grade II*
- Oldbury Court Estate, Bristol – Grade II
- Old Durham Gardens, County Durham – Grade II
- Orchardleigh Estate, Somerset – Grade II*
- Orpington Priory Gardens, London – Grade II
- Owlpen Manor, Gloucestershire – Grade II
- Pavilion Gardens, Buxton – Grade II*
- Peover Hall, Cheshire – Grade II
- Plumpton Rocks, North Yorkshire - Grade II*
- Plantation Garden, Norwich – Grade II
- Poundisford Park, Somerset – Grade II
- Port Eliot, Cornwall - Grade I
- Porter Valley Parks, Sheffield – Grade II
- Prideaux Place, Cornwall – Grade II
- Prior Park Landscape Garden, Bath – Grade I
- Priory Park, Dudley – Grade II
- Prospect Park, Reading – Grade II
- The Quarry, Shrewsbury – Grade II
- Renishaw Hall, Derbyshire – Grade II*
- Richmond Hill Terrace Gardens, London – Grade II*
- Rickerby Park, Carlisle – Grade II
- Rivington Terraced Gardens, Lancashire – Grade II
- Royal Hospital Chelsea, London - Grade II
- Royal Victoria Park, Bath – Grade II
- Salle Park, Norfolk – Grade II
- Shugborough Hall, Staffordshire – Grade I
- The Slopes, Buxton – Grade II
- South Park, Darlington – Grade II
- St Ann's Allotments, Nottingham – Grade II*
- St Paul's Walden Bury, Hertfordshire – Grade I
- St Michael's Mount, Cornwall – Grade II
- Stamford Park, Altrincham – Grade II
- Stanley Park, Liverpool – Grade II
- Stanmer Park, Sussex – Grade II
- Stoke Park, Bristol – Grade II
- Stoke Park, Northamptonshire – Grade II
- Stoke Poges Memorial Gardens, Buckinghamshire - Grade I
- Stoney Road Allotments, Coventry – Grade II*
- Stowe Landscape Gardens, Buckinghamshire - Grade I
- Sudbury Hall, Derbyshire – Grade II
- Sulgrave Manor, Northamptonshire – Grade II
- Sydney Gardens, Bath – Grade II
- Tabley House, Cheshire – Grade II
- Tatton Park Gardens, Cheshire – Grade II*
- Tintinhull Garden, Somerset – Grade II
- Town Walks, Dorchester – Grade II
- Trent Park, London – Grade II
- Tresco Abbey Gardens, Isles of Scilly – Grade I
- Turvey House and Gardens, Bedfordshire – Grade II
- Valentines Park, London – Grade II
- Victoria Park, Leicester – Grade II
- Victoria Park, London - Grade II*
- Victoria Park, Tipton – Grade II
- Victoria Park, Stoke-on-Trent – Grade II
- Waddesdon Manor, Buckinghamshire - Grade I
- Walpole Park, London – Grade II
- Wandsworth Park, London – Grade II
- Wanstead Park, London – Grade II*
- Ward Jackson Park, Hartlepool – Grade II
- Wardown Park, Luton – Grade II
- Warley Woods, West Midlands – Grade II
- Warwick Castle, Warwickshire – Grade I
- Wavertree Botanic Park and Gardens, Liverpool – Grade II
- Wenlock Priory, Shropshire – Grade II
- West Park, Macclesfield, Cheshire – Grade II
- West Park, Wolverhampton – Grade II*
- West Wycombe Park, Buckinghamshire - Grade I
- Westbourne Road Town Gardens, Birmingham – Grade II
- Westonbirt Arboretum, Gloucestershire - Grade I
- Wightwick Manor, West Midlands – Grade II
- Wimpole Estate, Cambridgeshire - Grade I

=== Cemeteries ===
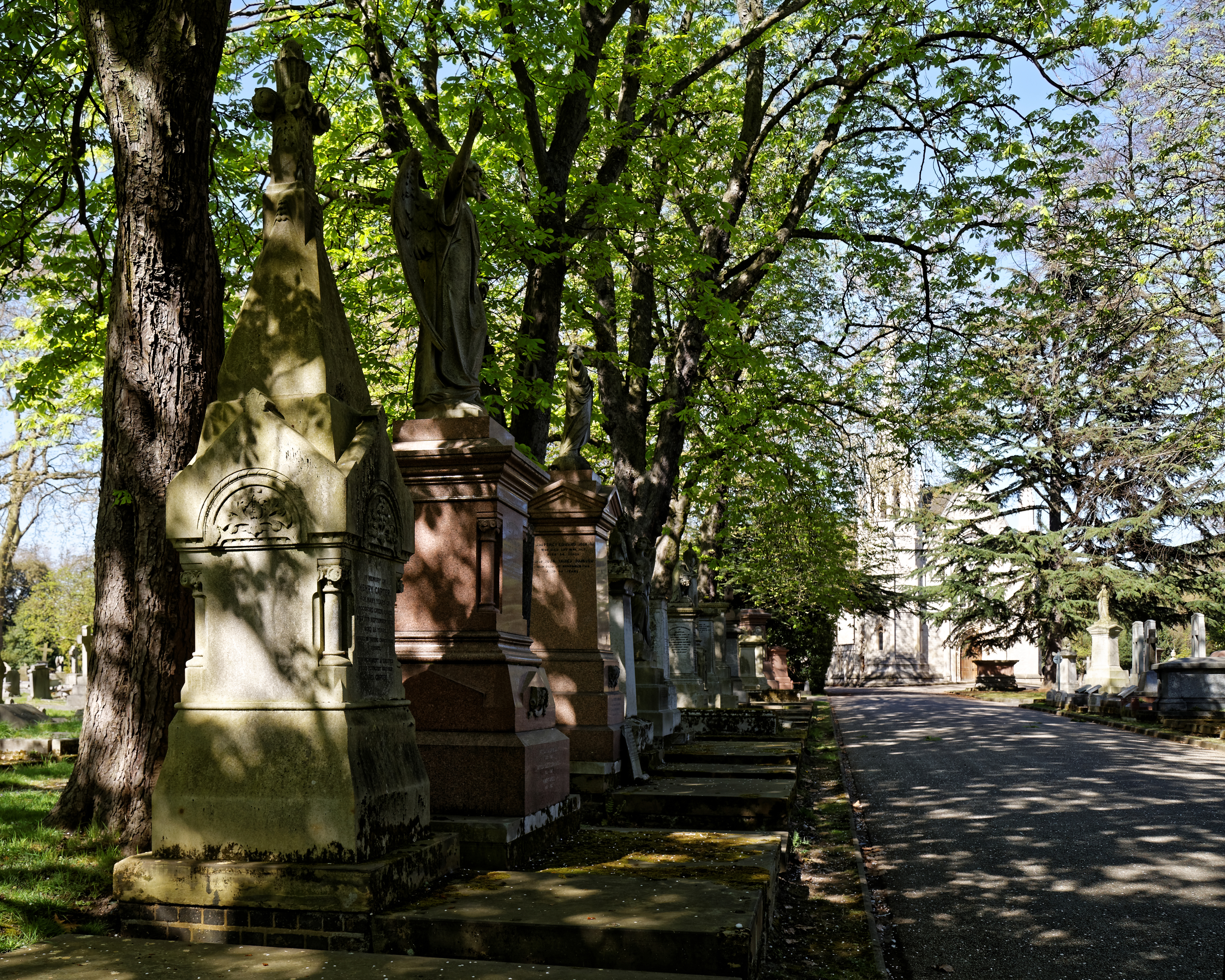
Grade II City of London Cemetery

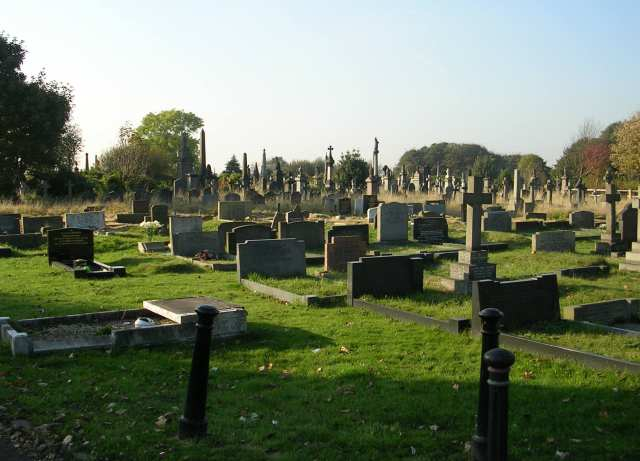
Undercliffe Cemetery, a Grade II cemetery in Bradford

The total number of cemeteries included on the Register is around 110. These include:

- Abney Park Cemetery, Stoke Newington – Grade II
- Allerton Cemetery, Liverpool – Grade II
- American Military Cemetery, Cambridge – Grade II
- Anfield Cemetery, Liverpool – Grade II
- Arnos Vale Cemetery, Bristol – Grade II
- Bath Abbey Cemetery, Bath – Grade II*
- Beckett Street Cemetery, Leeds – Grade II*
- Brompton Cemetery, London – Grade II*
- Brookwood Cemetery, Surrey – Grade I
- City of London Cemetery, London – Grade II
- Golders Green Crematorium, London – Grade II
- Grove Park Cemetery, London – Grade II
- Highgate Cemetery, London – Grade II*
- Kensal Green Cemetery, London – Grade II*
- Key Hill Cemetery, Birmingham – Grade II
- Nunhead Cemetery, London, formerly known as All Saints – Grade II*
- Old & New Cemeteries, Ipswich – Grade II*
- Reading Old Cemetery, Reading – Grade II
- Sheffield General Cemetery, Sheffield – Grade II
- Toxteth Park Cemetery, Liverpool – Grade II
- Undercliffe Cemetery, Bradford – Grade II
- West Norwood Cemetery, London, formerly known as The South Metropolitan Cemetery – Grade II*

== Delisted sites ==
- Philips Park, Bury – delisted 1999
