= Listed parks and gardens in the West Midlands (region) =

The Register of Historic Parks and Gardens of Special Historic Interest in England, created in 1983, is administered by Historic England. It includes more than 1,600 sites, ranging from gardens of private houses, to cemeteries and public parks.

There are 156 registered parks and gardens in West Midlands. 12 are listed at grade I, the highest grade, 48 at grade II*, the middle grade, and 96 at grade II, the lowest grade.

== Key ==
Grade	Criteria
I	Parks and gardens of exceptional interest, sometimes considered to be internationally important
II*	Particularly important parks and gardens of more than special interest
II	Parks and gardens of national importance and special interest

== Parks and gardens ==
=== Herefordshire ===
Name	Grade	Location	Type	Completed (Note: The date given is the date used by Historic England as significant for the initial building or that of an important part in the structure's description.)	Grid ref. (Note: The grid reference is based on the British national grid reference system, sometimes known as OSGB36, used by the Ordnance Survey.) Geo-coordinates	Entry number (Note: The "List Entry Number" is a unique number assigned to each listed building and scheduled monument by Historic England.)	Image
Berrington Hall	II*	Eye	Landscape park	Late 18th century	SO 51001 62042	1000873	Berrington Hall
Brampton Bryan Hall	II	Brampton Bryan	Deer park	16th century	SO 35921 71795	1000874	Brampton Bryan Hall
Brockhampton Estate	II	Brockhampton	Landscape park	Mid 18th century	SO6836755130	1000875	Brockhampton Estate
Broxwood Court	II	Pembridge	Park and garden	1860	SO 35498 53933	1000876	Upload Photo
Croft Castle	II*	Aymestrey	Landscape park	17th century	SO 44548 65331	1000878	Croft Castle
Downton Castle	II*	Burrington	Park and garden	Late 18th century	SO 44644 74208	1000497	Downton Castle
Eastnor Castle	II*	Colwall	Park and garden	1830s	SO 74446 37561	1000459	Eastnor Castle
Eywood	II	Titley	Landscape park	18th century	SO 32105 58852	1000879	Eywood
Foxley	II*	Weobley	Landscape park	1750s	SO 41022 45996	1000880	Foxley
Garnons	II*	Mansell Gamage	Landscape park	1790s	SO 39419 43895	1000881	Garnons
Gatley Park	II	Aymestrey	Park and garden	1900	SO 44958 68615	1000882	Gatley Park
Hampton Court Castle	II	Hope under Dinmore	Garden	1840s	SO5185652450	1403731	Hampton Court Castle
Hergest Croft	II*	Kington	Arboretum	20th century	SO 28365 56247	1000885	Hergest Croft
Hill Court Manor	II	Walford	Park and garden	Late 17th century	SO 57590 21677	1001303	Hill Court Manor
Holme Lacy	II*	Holme Lacy	Park and garden	Early 18th century	SO 55185 34738	1000500	Holme Lacy
Homme House	II	Much Marcle	Landscape park	1820s	SO6556732310	1000887	Homme House
Hope End	II	Colwall	Deer park	1820s	SO 72508 40578	1000276	Hope End
Kentchurch Court	II*	Garway	Deer park	Late 18th century	SO 42245 25714	1000888	Kentchurch Court
Kyre Park	II	Kyre	Landscape park	Late 18th century	SO6223363787	1000889	Kyre Park More images
Moccas Court	II*	Brobury with Monnington on Wye	Landscape park	Early 19th century	SO3440442968	1000891	Moccas Court
Nieuport House	II	Almeley	Park and garden	Early 20th century	SO 31893 52213	1001411	Nieuport House
Shobdon Court	II	Shobdon	Park and garden	Mid 18th century	SO 39843 62698	1000894	Shobdon Court
Stoke Edith House	II	Stoke Edith	Landscape park	1790s	SO6046941120	1000897	Stoke Edith House
Sufton Court	II*	Mordiford	Landscape park	1790s	SO 57366 37735	1000898	Sufton Court
Whitfield	II	Kingstone	Park and garden	1970s	SO4198832538	1000900	Whitfield

=== Shropshire ===
Name	Grade	Location	Type	Completed	Grid ref. Geo-coordinates	Entry number	Image
Acton Burnell Hall	II	Cound	Landscape park	1780s	SJ 54158 01462	1001112	Acton Burnell Hall
Aldenham Park	II	Morville	Garden	19th century	SO 66997 95313	1001113	Aldenham Park
Attingham Park	II*	Upton Magna	Landscape park	1798	SJ 55146 10115	1001114	Attingham Park
Badger Dingle	II	Badger	Landscape park	1780s	SO 77023 99675	1000541	Badger Dingle
Berwick Park	II	Bomere Heath and District	Park	1730s	SJ 47347 14816	1001706	Berwick Park
Boscobel House	II	Boscobel	Garden	1810s	SJ 83741 08064	1001115	Boscobel House
Brogyntyn	II	Selattyn and Gobowen	Park and garden	Mid 19th century	SJ 27793 31316	1001326	Brogyntyn
Burwarton House	II	Burwarton	Park and garden	Mid 19th century	SO6011185342	1001116	Burwarton House
Chetwynd House	II	Chetwynd	Deer park	Early 18th century	SJ7372720642	1001117	Chetwynd House
Condover Hall	II	Condover	Park and garden	1850s	SJ 49479 04946	1001118	Condover Hall
Court of Hill	II	Nash	Garden	Late 18th century	SO 60148 72840	1001119	Court of Hill
Davenport House	II*	Worfield	Park and garden	1750s	SO7512195884	1001120	Davenport House
Dudmaston Hall	II	Quatt Malvern	Park and garden	Late 18th century	SO 74894 88474	1001121	Dudmaston Hall
Ferney Hall	II	Onibury	Park and garden	17th century	SO 43215 77523	1001122	Ferney Hall
Hatton Grange	II	Ryton	Park and garden	Late 18th century	SJ7626604209	1001123	Hatton Grange
Hawkstone Park	I	Hodnet	Garden	Mid 18th century	SJ5936229138	1000199	Hawkstone Park More images
Henley Hall	II	Ludford	Park and garden	Late 19th century	SO5382375882	1001124	Henley Hall
Hodnet Hall	II	Hodnet	Park and garden	1920s	SJ 60668 28280	1001125	Hodnet Hall More images
Lilleshall Hall	II	Lilleshall	Park and garden	1840	SJ 74814 14214	1001126	Lilleshall Hall
Linley Hall	II	Worthen with Shelve	Park and garden	1740s	SO3388195267	1001127	Linley Hall
Longner Hall	II	Atcham	Landscape park	1800s	SJ5303611039	1001128	Longner Hall
Ludstone Hall	II	Claverley	Park and garden	1900	SO8002294247	1001129	Ludstone Hall
Millichope Park	II*	Munslow	Landscape park	1760s	SO 52370 88362	1001130	Millichope Park
Oakly Park	II*	Bromfield	Park and garden	1820s	SO4796276324	1001131	Oakly Park
Orleton Hall	II	Wrockwardine	Park and garden	18th century	SJ 63679 10997	1001132	Orleton Hall
Patshull Hall	II	Worfield	Garden	1760s	SJ8005301278	1000552	Patshull Hall
Pell Wall Hall	II	Sutton upon Tern	Park and garden	Early 19th century	SJ 67678 33152	1001402	Pell Wall Hall
Pitchford Hall	II	Pitchford	Park and garden	Early 19th century	SJ 52671 04433	1001133	Pitchford Hall
Pradoe	II	Ruyton-XI-Towns	Park and garden	1800s	SJ 35693 24741	1001251	Pradoe
Quarry Park and Dingle Gardens	II	Shrewsbury	Public park	1890s	SJ 48955 12082	1001134	Quarry Park and Dingle Gardens
Stokesay Court	II	Onibury	Park and garden	1890s	SO 44615 78722	1001306	Stokesay Court
Walcot	II	Edgton	Park and garden	1770s	SO 34993 84895	1001321	Walcot
Wenlock Abbey	II	Much Wenlock	Garden	1900	SJ 62522 00071	1001135	Wenlock Abbey More images
Weston Park	II*	Weston-under-Lizard	Park and garden	1760s	SJ8094809730	1000389	Weston Park

=== Staffordshire ===
Name	Grade	Location	Type	Completed	Grid ref. Geo-coordinates	Entry number	Image
Alton Towers	I	Denstone	Garden	Early 19th century	SK 07909 43048	1000191	Alton Towers More images
Biddulph Grange	I	Biddulph	Garden	1860s	SJ8956459115	1000115	Biddulph Grange More images
Burslem Park	II*	Burslem	Public park	1894	SJ 87397 50167	1001329	Burslem Park More images
Cannock Chase German Military Cemetery	I	Brocton	Cemetery	1967	SJ 98581 15803	1001674	Cannock Chase German Military Cemetery
Chillington Hall	II*	Brewood and Coven	Landscape park	1760	SJ8709706420	1001164	Chillington Hall
Enville Hall	II*	Enville	Park and garden	Mid 19th century	SO 82038 85999	1000114	Enville Hall
Hanley Park	II*	Stoke-on-Trent	Public park	1897	SJ 87900 46292	1001328	Hanley Park More images
Hartshill Cemetery	II	Stoke-on-Trent	Cemetery	1884	SJ 86396 45350	1001690	Hartshill Cemetery
Himley Hall	II	Himley	Landscape park	1820s	SO 88887 92154	1001270	Himley Hall More images
Keele Hall	II	Newcastle-under-Lyme	Park and garden	Mid 19th century	SJ 81814 44760	1001165	Keele Hall
Lichfield Cathedral Close and Park	II	Lichfield	Public park	18th century	SK 11455 09593	1001399	Lichfield Cathedral Close and Park
Maer Hall	II	Maer	Landscape park	1800s	SJ 78701 38555	1001246	Maer Hall More images
Queen's Park	II*	Longton	Public park	1887	SJ 90689 42009	1001389	Queen's Park
Sandon Hall	II	Sandon and Burston	Park and garden	1850	SJ9541728961	1001166	Sandon Hall
Shugborough Hall	I	Berkswich	Park and garden	1855	SJ9879521997	1001167	Shugborough Hall More images
Stapenhill Cemetery	II	Brizlincote	Cemetery	1866	SK 25841 22819	1001616	Stapenhill Cemetery
Trentham Gardens	II*	Swynnerton	Landscape park	Mid 19th century	SJ8617140183	1001168	Trentham Gardens
Victoria Park	II	Tunstall	Public park	1908	SJ 86536 51569	1001590	Victoria Park More images

=== Warwickshire ===
Name	Grade	Location	Type	Completed	Grid ref. Geo-coordinates	Entry number	Image
1 Castle Hill Garden	II	Kenilworth	Garden	1905	SP2818872395	1435329	1 Castle Hill Garden
Alscot Park	II	Alderminster	Park and garden	Mid 19th century	SP 20617 50305	1001183	Alscot Park
Anne Hathaway's Cottage	II	Stratford-upon-Avon	Garden	1920s	SP 18398 54717	1001184	Anne Hathaway's Cottage
Arbury Hall	II*	Astley	Park and garden	Mid 18th century	SP 33196 89247	1001185	Arbury Hall
Baddesley Clinton	II	Baddesley Clinton	Park and garden	19th century	SP 20089 71451	1001186	Baddesley Clinton
Bedworth Cemetery	II	Bedworth	Cemetery	1874	SP 35857 86770	1001592	Bedworth Cemetery
Bilton Grange	II	Dunchurch	Garden	Mid 19th century	SP 49329 71891	1001378	Bilton Grange
Charlecote Park	II*	Hampton Lucy	Park and garden	19th century	SP 25704 56287	1001187	Charlecote Park More images
Clifford Manor	II	Clifford Chambers and Milcote	Garden	1919	SP 19988 51878	1001188	Clifford Manor
Compton Verney House	II*	Combrook	Landscape park	Mid 18th century	SP3100352592	1000369	Compton Verney House
Combe Abbey	II*	Binley Woods	Park and gardens	1870s	SP 40102 79655	1000408	Combe Abbey
Dunchurch Lodge	II	Dunchurch	Garden	1908	SP 48928 71328	1001281	Upload Photo
Farnborough Hall	I	Avon Dassett	Park and garden	Mid 18th century	SP4274249465	1000110	Farnborough Hall
Guy's Cliffe	II	Old Milverton	Garden	Early 19th century	SP 28866 67540	1001602	Guy's Cliffe
Hill Close Gardens	II*	Warwick	Allotments	1845	SP 27814 64822	1001285	Hill Close Gardens More images
Honington Hall	II*	Honington	Park and garden	19th century	SP 26321 42330	1001189	Honington Hall
Kenilworth Castle	II*	Kenilworth	16th century	Park and gardens	SP 28268 71824	1000496	Kenilworth Castle More images
Lord Leycester Hospital	II	Warwick	Garden	15th century	SP 28022 64704	1001597	Lord Leycester Hospital
Mallory Court	II	Bishop's Tachbrook	Garden	1916	SP 32137 62146	1001669	Mallory Court
Merevale Hall	II*	Merevale	Park and garden	Mid 19th century	SP2924397200	1001190	Merevale Hall
Newnham Paddox	II	Monks Kirby	Park and garden	Late 19th century	SP 47754 83565	1001191	Newnham Paddox
Packington Hall	II*	Little Packington	Landscape park	Mid 18th century	SP 22670 83864	1001193	Packington Hall
Packwood House	II*	Lapworth	Park and garden	1870s	SP1716172320	1001194	Packwood House
Radway Grange	II*	Radway	Park and garden	1759	SP3722147751	1001195	Radway Grange
Ragley Hall	II*	Alcester	Park and garden	Late 19th century	SP0694856027	1001196	Ragley Hall
Ryton House	II	Ryton-on-Dunsmore	Park and garden	Early 19th century	SP 38923 74040	1001343	Upload Photo
Shakespeare's Gardens, New Place	II	Stratford-upon-Avon	Garden	1920s	SP 20146 54758	1001192	Shakespeare's Gardens, New Place
Spa Gardens	II	Royal Leamington Spa	Public park	1903	SP 31851 65527	1000498	Spa Gardens
Stoneleigh Abbey	II*	Ashow	Park and gardens	1813	SP 31474 70826	1000377	Stoneleigh Abbey
Upton House	II*	Ratley and Upton	Park and garden	18th century	SP3716945359	1001197	Upton House
Warwick Castle	I	Warwick	Park and gardens	1869	SP 28540 63341	1000386	Warwick Castle More images
Wroxall Abbey	II	Baddesley Clinton	Park and garden	1868	SP2179070694	1001198	Wroxall Abbey

=== West Midlands ===
Name	Grade	Location	Type	Completed	Grid ref. Geo-coordinates	Entry number	Image
Aston Hall	II	Birmingham	Public park	1920s	SP 07959 89791	1001199	Aston Hall More images
Birmingham Botanical Gardens	II*	Birmingham	Botanic garden	1832	SP 04853 85400	1001200	Birmingham Botanical Gardens More images
Brandwood End Cemetery	II	Kings Heath	Cemetery	1899	SP 07077 79819	1001546	Brandwood End Cemetery
Brunswick Park	II	Wednesbury	Public park	1887	SO 99494 95419	1001298	Brunswick Park More images
Cannon Hall Park	II*	Moseley	Public park	1873	SP 06688 83739	1001489	Cannon Hall Park
Castle Bromwich Hall	II*	Castle Bromwich	Garden	1740	SP 14137 89743	1000118	Castle Bromwich Hall More images
Dartmouth Park	II	West Bromwich	Public park	1876	SP 01336 91350	1001102	Dartmouth Park More images
Edgbaston Hall	II	Birmingham	Landscape park	1776	SP0551884379	1001201	Edgbaston Hall
Great Barr Hall	II	Pheasey	Landscape park	1790s	SP 04800 95482	1001202	Great Barr Hall
Handsworth Park	II	Birmingham	Public park	1887	SP 05165 90321	1001473	Handsworth Park More images
Highbury Hall	II	Birmingham	Garden	1879	SP0674682438	1001203	Highbury Hall
Key Hill Cemetery	II*	Hockley	Cemetery	1836	SP 05895 88104	1001352	Key Hill Cemetery
Lady Herbert's Garden	II	Coventry	Public park	1938	SP 33553 79378	1001449	Lady Herbert's Garden
The Leasowes	I	Halesowen	Garden	1750s	SO9762183979	1001204	The Leasowes More images
London Road Cemetery	I	Coventry	Cemetery	1845	SP 34180 78079	1001205	London Road Cemetery
Priory Park	II	Dudley	Public park	1929	SO 94313 90889	1001650	Priory Park More images
Sutton Park	II	Sutton Coldfield	Public park	Late 19th century	SP 09966 97096	1001307	Sutton Park
Stoney Road Allotments	II*	Coventry	Allotments	Mid 19th century	SP 33403 77940	1001494	Stoney Road Allotments
The Vale	II	Edgbaston	University campus	1960	SP 05244 84894	1001483	The Vale
Victoria Park	II	Tipton	Public park	1901	SO 95915 91982	1001504	Victoria Park More images
Walsall Arboretum	II	Walsall	Public park	1874	SP 02098 98982	1001534	Walsall Arboretum
Walsall Memorial Garden	II	Walsall	Memorial garden	1952	SP 01594 98231	1001423	Walsall Memorial Garden
War Memorial Park	II	Coventry	Memorial garden	1935	SP3248977217	1408915	War Memorial Park
Warley Park	II	Warley	Landscape park	1795	SP 01216 86022	1001301	Warley Park More images
Warstone Lane Cemetery	II	Hockley	Cemetery	1848	SP 05887 87837	1001545	Warstone Lane Cemetery
West Park	II*	Wolverhampton	Public park	1881	SO 90610 99111	1001206	West Park More images
Westbourne Road Town Gardens	II	Birmingham	Garden	Mid 19th century	SP 04902 85014	1001375	Upload Photo
Wightwick Manor	II	Wolverhampton	Garden	1905	SO 86811 98478	1001421	Wightwick Manor More images
Witton Cemetery	II	Witton	Cemetery	1861	SP 08194 92255	1001612	Witton Cemetery
Winterbourne Botanic Garden	II	Birmingham	Garden	1903	SP 05331 83884	1001702	Winterbourne Botanic Garden

=== Worcestershire ===
Name	Grade	Location	Type	Completed	Grid ref. Geo-coordinates	Entry number	Image
Abberley Hall	II	Abberley	Park and garden	Late 19th century	SO 74582 66505	1001392	Abberley Hall
Arley House	II	Upper Arley	Arboretum	19th century	SO 76319 80806	1000872	Arley House More images
Croome Court	I	High Green	Landscape park	Mid 18th century	SO8670044726	1000458	Croome Court
Gheluvelt Park	II	Worcester	Memorial garden	1924	SO8442356549	1425120	Gheluvelt Park
Hagley Hall	I	Hagley	Landscape park	1750s	SO 92181 81529	1000352	Hagley Hall
Hanbury Hall	II	Hanbury	Park and garden	Mid 19th century	SO9409664155	1000883	Hanbury Hall
Hartlebury Castle	II	Hartlebury	Park and garden	18th century	SO 83870 71419	1000884	Hartlebury Castle
Hewell Grange	II*	Tardebigge	Landscape park	1812	SP0096469038	1000886	Hewell Grange
Madresfield Court	II*	Powick	Park and garden	1903	SO 81629 47697	1000890	Madresfield Court
Ombersley Court	II	Ombersley	Park and garden	1820	SO8418162906	1439026	Ombersley Court
Overbury Court	II*	Kemerton	Park and garden	1920s	SO 95890 38233	1000892	Overbury Court
Pirton Park	II	Severn Stoke	Deer park	1760s	SO8730047363	1001414	Pirton Park
Rous Lench Court	II*	Rous Lench	Park and garden	Late 19th century	SP0186853739	1000893	Rous Lench Court
Spetchley Park	II*	Whittington	Park and garden	1930s	SO8923353594	1000895	Spetchley Park
Westwood Park	II	Droitwich Spa	Park and garden	17th century	SO 87550 63771	1000899	Westwood Park
Witley Court	II*	Little Witley	Park and garden	Mid 19th century	SO 76927 64907	1000901	Witley Court
