= Listed parks and gardens in North East England =

The Register of Historic Parks and Gardens of Special Historic Interest in England, created in 1983, is administered by Historic England. It includes more than 1,600 sites, ranging from gardens of private houses, to cemeteries and public parks.

There are 56 registered parks and gardens in North East England. 4 are listed at grade I, the highest grade, 13 at grade II*, the middle grade, and 38 at grade II, the lowest grade.

== Key ==
Grade	Criteria
I	Parks and gardens of exceptional interest, sometimes considered to be internationally important
II*	Particularly important parks and gardens of more than special interest
II	Parks and gardens of national importance and special interest

== Parks and gardens ==
=== County Durham ===
Name	Grade	Location	Type	Completed (Note: The date given is the date used by Historic England as significant for the initial building or that of an important part in the structure's description.)	Grid ref. (Note: The grid reference is based on the British national grid reference system, sometimes known as OSGB36, used by the Ordnance Survey.) Geo-coordinates	Entry number (Note: The "List Entry Number" is a unique number assigned to each listed building and scheduled monument by Historic England.)	Image
Apollo or Pasmore Pavilion	II	Peterlee	Park	1968	NZ 42184 39633	1001606	Apollo or Pasmore Pavilion
Auckland Castle Park	II*	Bishop Auckland	Garden	18th century	NZ2160830646	1000727	Auckland Castle Park
Bowes Museum	II	Barnard Castle	Garden	1876	NZ 05562 16309	1000728	Bowes Museum
Brancepeth Castle	II	Brancepeth	Garden	1780s	NZ2273637304	1000729	Brancepeth Castle
Burn Hall	II	Durham	Garden	Early 19th century	NZ 26199 38512	1001310	Burn Hall
The Castle, Castle Eden	II	Horden	Garden	Mid 18th century	NZ4353439803	1001311	The Castle, Castle Eden
Ceddesfeld Hall Gardens	II	Sedgefield	Garden	1750s	NZ 35797 28619	1001698	Ceddesfeld Hall Gardens
Croxdale Hall	II*	Durham	Garden	Late 18th century	NZ 27588 37716	1001271	Croxdale Hall
Cummins Engine Factory	II	Darlington	Factory grounds	1966	NZ3178413747	1467759	Cummins Engine Factory
Hardwick Hall Country Park	II*	Sedgefield	Garden	1760	NZ 34667 29132	1000730	Hardwick Hall Country Park
Lambton Castle	II	Bournmoor	Garden	Early 19th century	NZ 29380 52481	1001438	Lambton Castle
Lartington Hall	II	Cotherstone	Garden	1863	NZ0221517621	1000731	Lartington Hall
Lumley Castle	II	Little Lumley	Garden	1760s	NZ 29073 50842	1001395	Lumley Castle
Old Durham Gardens	II	Durham	Garden	Mid 17th century	NZ 28729 41918	1001396	Old Durham Gardens More images
Raby Castle	II*	Staindrop	Garden	1780s	NZ 12769 22034	1000732	Raby Castle
Ramshaw Hall Garden	II	Ramshaw, Bishop Auckland	Garden	Late 17th century	NZ1531326463	1404998	Ramshaw Hall Garden
Rokeby Park	II*	Rokeby	Garden	Late 18th century	NZ0806813948	1000733	Rokeby Park
Ropner Park	II*	Stockton-on-Tees	Park	1893	NZ 43344 18211	1001628	Ropner Park
South Park	II	Darlington	Park	1851	NZ 28718 13467	1001278	South Park More images
Ward Jackson Park	II	Hartlepool	Park	1883	NZ 49018 32482	1001349	Ward Jackson Park More images
West Cemetery	II	Darlington	Cemetery	1858	NZ 27160 13998	1001562	West Cemetery
Windlestone Hall	II	Windlestone	Garden	Mid 19th century	NZ 26456 28428	1001407	Windlestone Hall
Wynyard Park	II*	Wynyard	Garden	Mid 19th century	NZ4116326111	1000372	Wynyard Park

=== Northumberland ===
Name	Grade	Location	Type	Completed	Grid ref. Geo-coordinates	Entry number	Image
Alnwick Castle	I	Longhoughton	Garden	Early 19th century	NU1739315366	1001041	Alnwick Castle
Belford Hall	II	Belford	Garden	Mid 18th century	NU 11272 34076	1001574	Belford Hall
Belsay Hall	I	Belsay	Garden	1867	NZ 08851 78249	1001042	Belsay Hall
Blagdon Hall	II	Stannington	Garden	Early 20th century	NZ 21772 76910	1001043	Blagdon Hall
Capheaton Hall	II	Capheaton	Garden	Late 18th century	NZ 03661 80014	1001044	Capheaton Hall
Chillingham Castle	II	Chillingham	Garden	Late 17th century	NU 06840 25822	1001045	Chillingham Castle
Cragside	I	Rothbury	Garden	1900	NU0733902528	1001046	Cragside
Hesleyside Hall	II	Bellingham	Garden	Late 18th century	NY 81669 83738	1001047	Hesleyside Hall
Hexham Parks	II	Hexham	Park	1928	NY 93293 64084	1001627	Hexham Parks
Howick Hall	II	Longhoughton	Garden	Early 19th century	NU 24901 17424	1001048	Howick Hall
Kirkharle Hall	II	Kirkwhelpington	Garden	1743	NZ0129482860	1001049	Kirkharle Hall
Lindisfarne Castle	II	Holy Island	Garden	1912	NU 13650 41746	1001050	Lindisfarne Castle
Nunwick Hall	II	Simonburn	Garden	1760s	NY8794874116	1001051	Nunwick Hall
Seaton Delaval Hall	II*	Seaton Valley	Garden	Early 18th century	NZ 32683 75730	1001052	Seaton Delaval Hall
St Andrew's Cemetery	II	Hexham	Cemetery	1859	NY 91937 64984	1001714	St Andrew's Cemetery
St Mary's Hospital	II	Stannington	Hospital grounds	1914	NZ 18175 81063	1001478	St Mary's Hospital
Tillmouth Park	II*	Cornhill-on-Tweed	Garden	Late 19th century	NT 87998 43057	1001053	Tillmouth Park
Wallington Hall	II*	Wallington Demesne	Garden	1777	NZ0266184529	1001054	Wallington Hall

=== North Yorkshire ===
Name	Grade	Location	Type	Completed	Grid ref. Geo-coordinates	Entry number	Image
Albert Park	II	Middlesbrough	Park	1868	NZ 49579 19109	1000646	Albert Park
Valley Gardens	II	Saltburn	Park	1867	NZ 66629 21130	1001429	Valley Gardens

=== Tyne and Wear ===
Name	Grade	Location	Type	Completed	Grid ref. Geo-coordinates	Entry number	Image
Bradley Park	II	Gateshead	Garden	Late 18th century	NZ 12272 63071	1001179	Bradley Park
Gibside	I	Gateshead	Garden	1760	NZ 18025 58007	1000508	Gibside
Jesmond Dene, Armstrong and Heaton Parks	II	Newcastle upon Tyne	Park	1860	NZ2594367116	1001180	Jesmond Dene, Armstrong and Heaton Parks
Leazes Park	II	Newcastle upon Tyne	Park	1873	NZ 24253 64919	1000550	Leazes Park
Mowbray Park	II	Sunderland	Park	1857	NZ 39875 56580	1001320	Mowbray Park
Newcastle General Cemetery	II*	Newcastle upon Tyne	Cemetery	1836	NZ 25728 65490	1001181	Newcastle General Cemetery
North and South Marine Parks and Bents Park	II	South Tyneside	Park	1890	NZ 37097 67430	1001466	North and South Marine Parks and Bents Park
Roker Park	II	Sunderland	Park	1880	NZ 40530 59088	1001325	Roker Park
Saltwell Park	II	Gateshead	Park	1870	NZ 25438 61116	1001182	Saltwell Park
St Andrew's Cemetery	II	Jesmond	Cemetery	1857	NZ 24974 66235	1000877	St Andrew's Cemetery
St John's Cemetery	II	Newcastle upon Tyne	Cemetery	1857	NZ 22484 63722	1000761	St John's Cemetery
Westgate Hill Cemetery	II	Newcastle upon Tyne	Cemetery	1829	NZ 23686 64161	1001680	Westgate Hill Cemetery
Woolsington Park	II	Woolsington	Garden	Early 19th century	NZ 20071 70252	1001322	Woolsington Park
