= Walled garden =

Garden enclosed in high walls

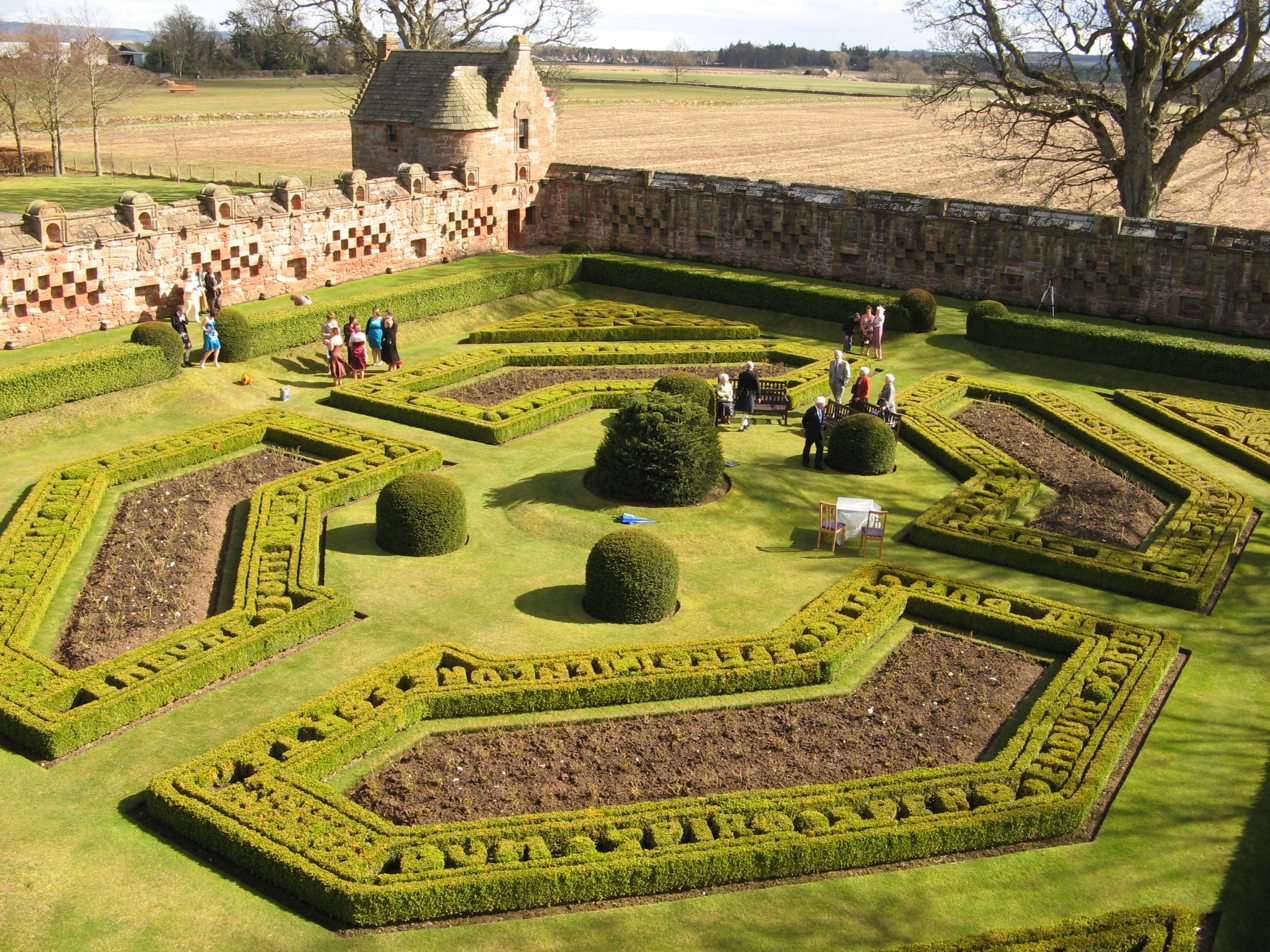
The walled garden of Edzell Castle, Scotland, survives from the early seventeenth century.

A walled garden is a garden enclosed by high walls, especially when this is done for horticultural rather than security purposes, although originally all gardens may have been enclosed for protection from animal or human intruders. In temperate climates, especially colder areas, such as Scotland, the essential function of the walling of a garden is to shelter the garden from wind and frost, though it may also serve a decorative purpose. Kitchen gardens were very often walled, which segregated them socially, allowing the gardeners, who were usually expected to vanish from the "pleasure gardens" when the occupants of the house were likely to be about, to continue their work. The walls, which were sometimes heated, also carried fruit trees trained as espaliers.

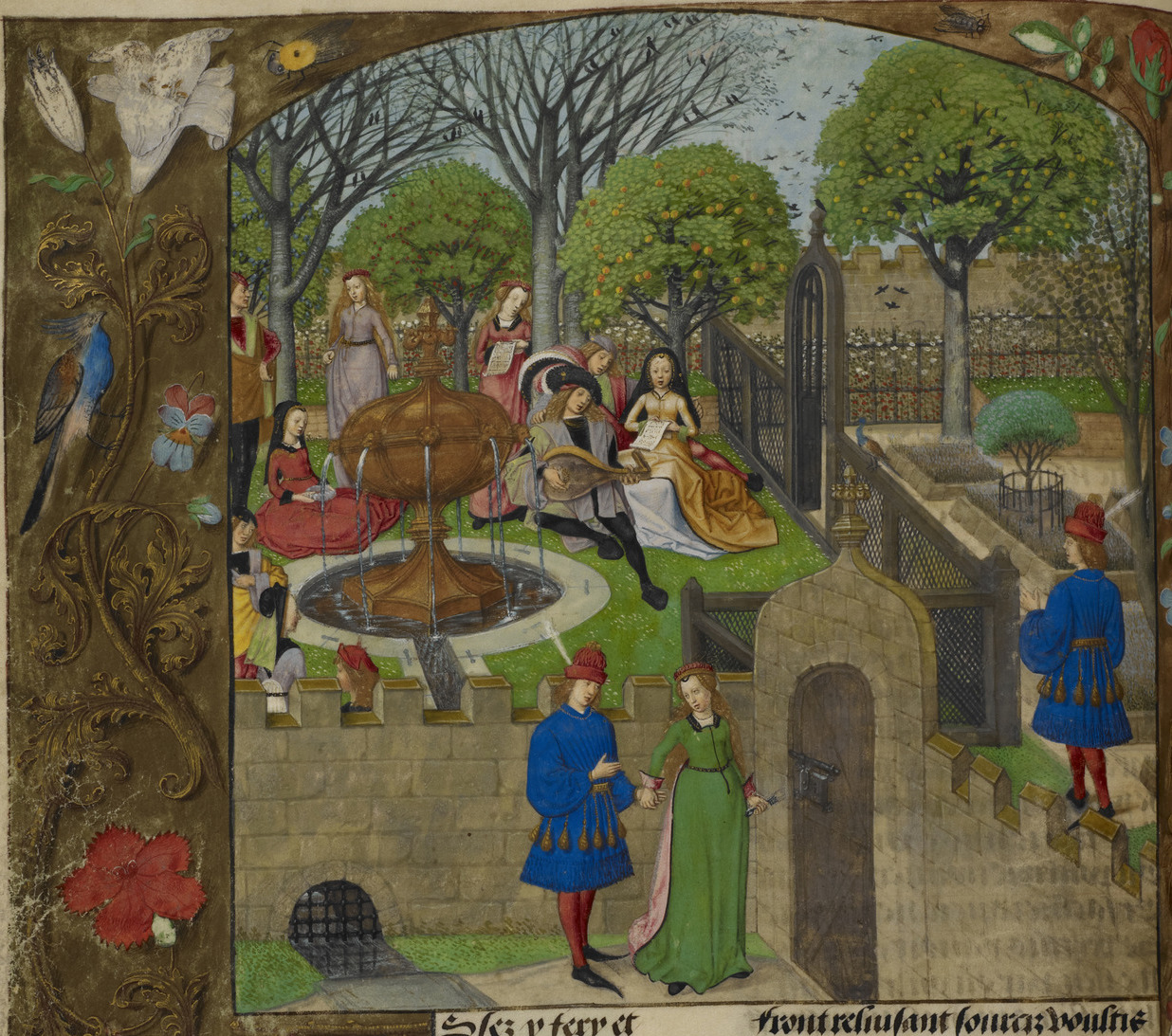
Detail of miniature, c. 1490s, showing a garden walled all round, with internal fencing of various kinds. The stone walls are unrealistically low for artistic convenience.

Historically, and still in many parts of the world, nearly all urban houses with any private outside space have high walls for security, and any small garden was thus walled by default. The same was true of many rural houses and other buildings, for example religious ones. In palaces and most country houses, the whole plot, including even a very large garden, was also walled or at least fenced, sometimes with (much more expensive) metal railings along those parts of the boundary giving the best views to show off the splendour of the residence, as at the Palace of Versailles, Buckingham Palace and many others. In some cases there was originally a fence or hedging, but a wall was added later when funds allowed. In particular, hiring local labour to build a wall was considered a praiseworthy method of famine relief for the rich, and many walls round the grounds of country houses in the British Isles date to the famine years of the 1840s.

The horticultural, and also social, advantages of a walled garden meant that kitchen gardens often form or formed a walled compound within a larger walled compound. Sometimes this was for the security of the plants; in the 1630s the royal botanical garden of France (now the Jardin des plantes), itself walled all round, had an inner walled-off tulip garden, as the bulbs were valuable and prone to thefts.

Metaphorically, "walled garden" may be used in many contexts (often pejoratively) to indicate a space, usually not a literal physical location, which is or is seen as closed to outsiders. One example is the closed platform in computing, or exclusivity and product ecosystem "lock-in" in technology.

== Creation of microclimates ==
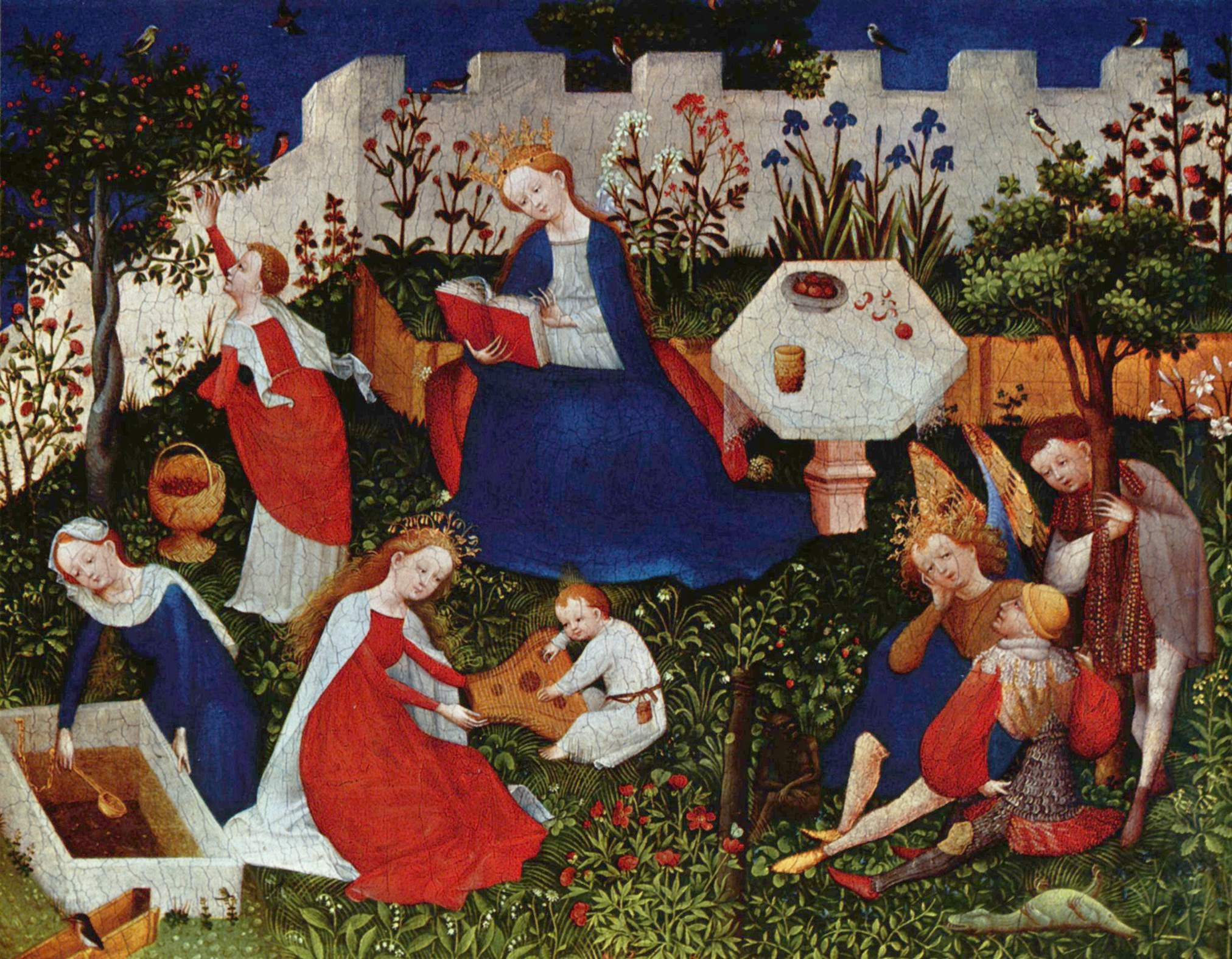
15th-century Hortus conclusus, with the Virgin Mary reading, imagined by the Upper Rhenish Master

The shelter provided by enclosing walls can raise the ambient temperature within a garden by several degrees, creating a microclimate that permits plants to be grown that would not survive in the unmodified local climate.

Most walls are constructed from stone or brick, which absorb and retain solar heat and then slowly release it, raising the temperature against the wall, allowing peaches, nectarines, and grapes to be grown as espaliers against south-facing walls as far north as northwest England and southern Ireland.

The ability of a well-designed walled garden to create widely varying stable environments is illustrated by this description of the rock garden in the Jardin des Plantes in Paris' 5ème arrondissement, where over 2,000 species from a variety of climate zones ranging from mountainous to Mediterranean are grown within a few acres:

The garden is protected from sudden changes in weather conditions and from harsh winds, thanks to its hollowed out terraces and the big trees .... The gardeners make the most of the northern or southern exposures and the permanently shady areas of this little, sheltered valley. Within just a few metres, temperatures can range from 15 to 20 degrees C, what one would call a micro-climate!

=== Heated walls ===
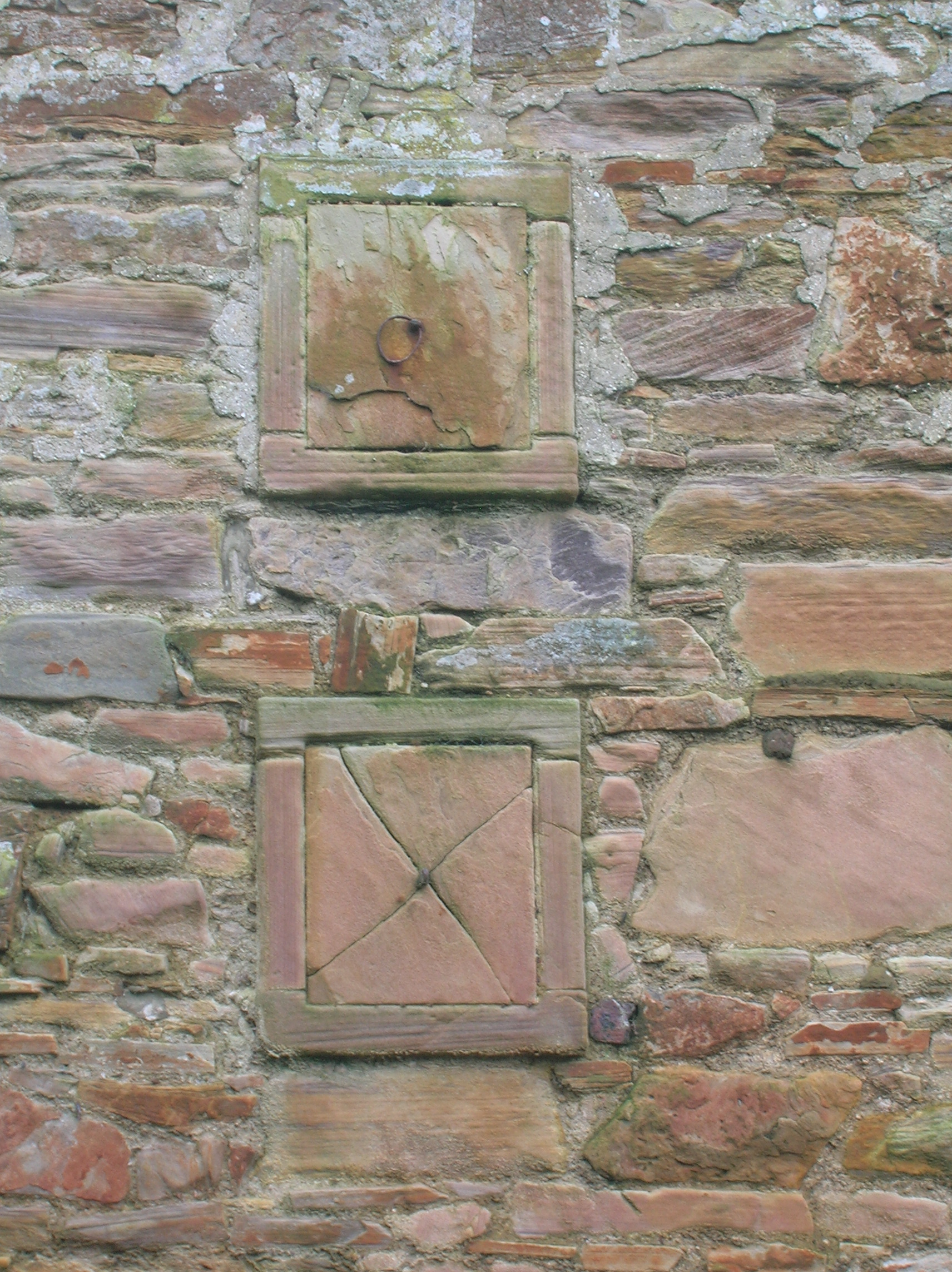
Movable blocks to control the movement of hot air in the heated wall at Eglinton Country Park

A number of walled gardens in Britain have a hot wall or fruit wall, a hollow wall with a central cavity, or openings in the wall on the side facing towards the garden, so that fires could be lit inside the wall to provide additional heat to protect the fruit growing against the wall. Heat would escape into the garden through these openings, and the smoke from the fires would be directed upwards through chimneys or flues. This kind of hollow wall is found at Croxteth Hall in Liverpool and Bank Hall in Bretherton, both in England, and Eglinton Country Park and Dunmore House, both in Scotland. At Croome Court an 18th-century cavity wall had a number of small furnaces to supply gentle heat (see below). In the 1800s, such walls were lined with pipes and connected to a boiler, as at Bank Hall in Bretherton.

== Design ==
The traditional design of a walled garden, split into four quarters separated by paths, and a wellhead or pool at the centre, dates back to the very earliest gardens of Persia. The hortus conclusus or "enclosed garden" of High Medieval Europe was more typically enclosed by hedges or fencing, or the arcades of a cloister; though some protection from weather and effective protection from straying animals was afforded, these were not specifically walled gardens.

=== Kitchen gardens ===
In the United Kingdom, many country houses had walled kitchen gardens which were distinct from decorative gardens. One acre of a kitchen garden was expected to provide enough produce to feed twelve people, and these gardens ranged in size from one acre up to twenty or thirty acres depending on the size of the household. The largest gardens served extremely large households, for example, the royal kitchen garden at Windsor was built for Queen Victoria in 1844 and initially occupied twenty two acres, but was enlarged to thirty one acres to supply the growing household. Kitchen gardens received their greatest elaboration in the second half of the nineteenth century. Many of these labor-intensive gardens fell into disuse in the twentieth century, but some have been revived as decorative gardens, and others used to produce fruits, vegetables or flowers.

Susan Campbell, in a book devoted to walled kitchen gardens, mentions several factors which contribute to how productive a kitchen garden is. Productivity depended upon the suitability of the situation, and successful gardens depended on the availability of water, manure, heat, wall space, storage space, workrooms, and most importantly, a dedicated team of gardeners.

== Examples ==
Entering the walled garden at Scargill House in Yorkshire

British examples of walled gardens can be found at Alnwick Castle, Castle Bromwich Hall Gardens, Fulham Palace, Goodnestone Park, Hampton Court Palace, Luton Hoo, Osborne House, Polesden Lacey, Shugborough Hall, Trengwainton Garden, and Wollaton Park in England; Bodysgallen Hall in Wales; and Edzell Castle, Muchalls Castle, and Myres Castle in Scotland.

The walled kitchen garden at Croome Court, Worcestershire is reputedly the largest 18th-century walled kitchen garden in Europe. It is in private ownership and has been restored by the current owners. In about 1806, a 13 ft (4.0 m) high free-standing east–west hot wall was built, slightly off-centre, serviced by five furnaces; this is historically significant as it is one of the first such structures to be built.

The walled kitchen garden at Chilton Foliat, Wiltshire, was the subject of the 1987 television documentary series The Victorian Kitchen Garden.

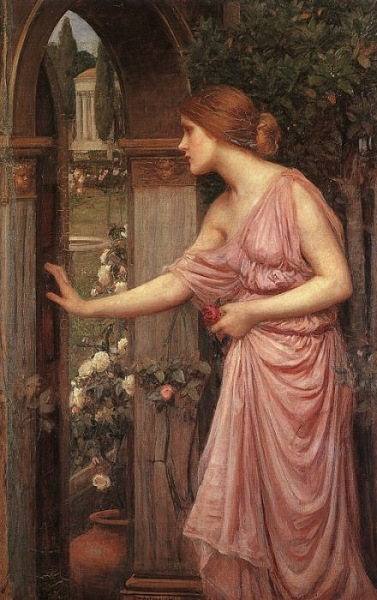
Psyche Opening the Door into Cupid's Garden, by John William Waterhouse, 1903

== In literature ==
In the story of Susanna and the Elders, a walled garden is the scene of both an alleged tryst and an attempted rape. Because of the walls, the community is unable to determine which actually occurred.

In John William Waterhouse's interpretation of the myth of Cupid and Psyche, Psyche lived in Cupid's walled garden.

Much of the storyline of Frances Hodgson Burnett's children's story The Secret Garden revolves around a walled garden which has been locked for ten years. The author was inspired by Great Maytham Hall in Kent.

"Rappaccini's Daughter", a short story by Nathaniel Hawthorne, takes place almost entirely within the confines of a walled garden in which Beatrice, the lovely daughter of a mad scientist, lives alongside gorgeous but lethal flowers.

In The Last Enchantment, the third book in Mary Stewart's novels of the Arthurian legend, Merlin constructs a heated wall for his garden at Applegarth.

== See also ==
- Media related to Walled gardens at Wikimedia Commons
- List of garden types
- Season extension
- Hortus conclusus
