= Gheluvelt Park, Worcester =

Public park in Worcester, England

Coordinates: 52.206634°N 2.228336°W

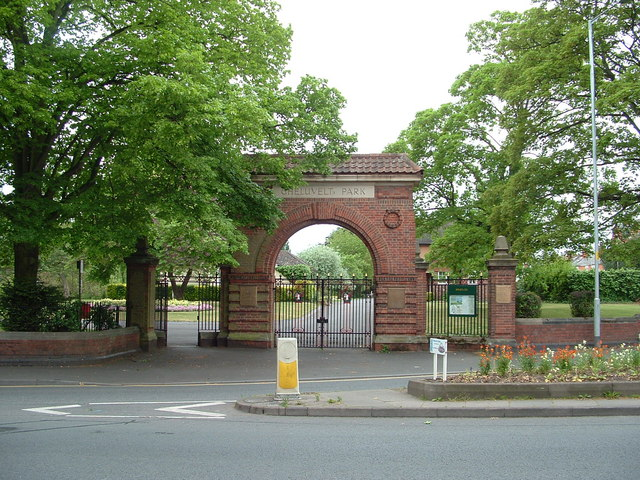
The main gate to the park which is close to the junction of the A38 and the A449

Gheluvelt Park is a public park in Worcester, England, which opened on 17 June 1922 to commemorate the Worcestershire Regiment's 2nd Battalion after their part in Battle of Gheluvelt, a World War I battle that took place on 31 October 1914 in Gheluvelt (near Ypres), Belgium. It was opened by Field Marshal John French, 1st Earl of Ypres, who stated, "on that day the 2nd Worcesters saved the British Empire." A plaque inside the park commemorates Captain Gerald Ernest Lea, who died on 15 September 1914 while commanding D. Company of the 2nd Battalion.

The park is located in Worcester, along the A449 (Barbourne Road) and stretches across to the River Severn. The Barbourne Brook, which leads to the Severn, feeds a duck pond within which is a bandstand. The park contains a children's play area and a supervised paddling pool. A conservation site is managed by the Duckworth Worcestershire Trust and, following renovations to the old Victorian Pump House, the Environment Centre provides information about environmental issues as well as sustainability. The Friends of Gheluvelt Park organisation helps maintain the parks and organise events such as Carols in the Park and a St George's Day celebration. A significant area of the park, including the children's play area, was flooded by the Severn and the Barbourne Brook during the 2007 United Kingdom floods in July.

Gheluvelt Park has received £850,000 from the Heritage Lottery Fund, in order to improve the park. A new play area has been created, a Splash Pad built for toddlers to early teens, the railings have been reinstated along Barbourne Road, and the bandstand has been renovated. Recently, a sculpture costing £33,000 was installed, to symbolise the fallen soldiers, and a funding application has been submitted for outdoor fitness equipment for adults, (2011), including six exercise units and also two concrete table tennis tables. Funding applications have also been made to host a community "Fitness event" in Autumn 2011.
