= Arley House and Gardens =

Gardens in Worcestershire, England

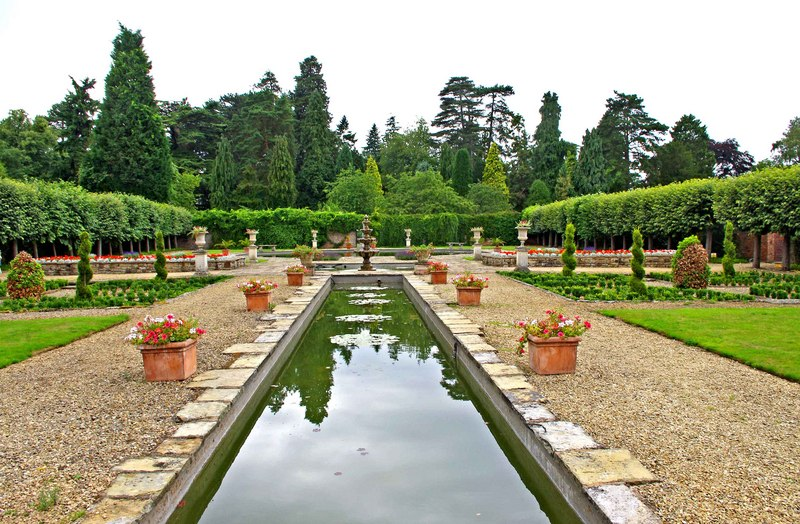
- The Italian garden in 2010, looking west
- Interactive map of Arley House and Gardens
- Location: Upper Arley
- OS grid: SO 765 806
- Coordinates: 52°25′22″N 2°20′49″W
- Designation: Grade II
- Website: www.arleyestate.co.uk/arley-house-gardens

Arley House and Gardens are situated at Upper Arley, about 4 miles (6.4 km) north-west of Bewdley, in Worcestershire, England. The gardens, arboretum and parkland are listed Grade II in Historic England's Register of Parks and Gardens.

== History ==
The manor of Upper Arley was acquired in the mid 15th century by Thomas de Littleton, and remained with the Lyttelton family until the death of Thomas Lyttelton, 2nd Baron Lyttelton, in 1779; it then passed to his sister Lucy, wife of Arthur Annesley, 1st Earl of Mountnorris, and then to their son George Annesley, 2nd Earl of Mountnorris, who built Arley Castle in 1844. He died in that year without issue and the manor passed to his nephew Arthur Lyttelton Annesley, who sold it in 1852 to Robert Woodward. It remained in the family until 1959, when it was sold to R D Turner; it was privately owned until 1997.

Arley Castle was a sandstone building in Gothic style, situated on high ground near the east bank of the River Severn; it was an enlargement of a 16th- and 17th-century building. It was demolished in the early 1960s.

== Description ==
The present Arley House, a two-storey building, was built about 1965 on the site of Arley Castle. It is a venue for weddings, private parties and corporate events. There are gardens, area about 2 hectares (4.9 acres), around the house, laid out in the late 20th century.

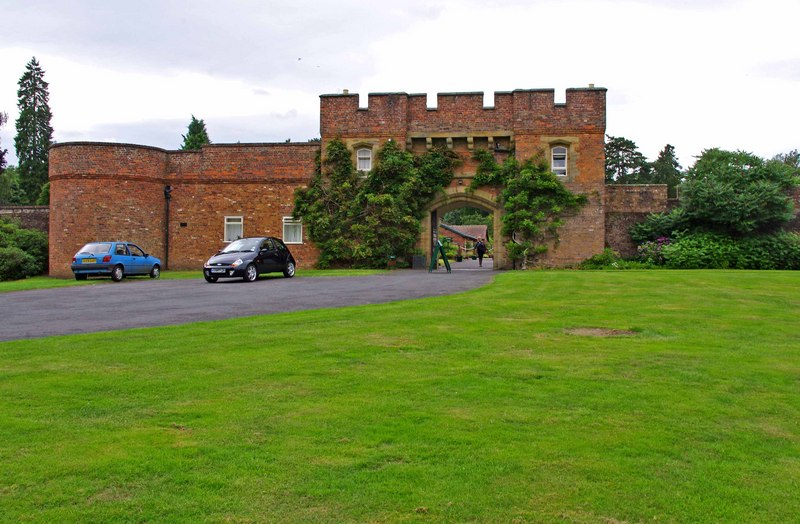
The lodge at the entrance to the gardens

A lodge near Arley House, formerly part of Arley Castle, has two storeys, a crenellated parapet and corner turrets. It is a Grade II listed building. A lodge north-west of the house, at the entrance to the gardens and arboretum, has a crenellated parapet and two towers flanking the central entrance; it dates from the building of Arley Castle and is Grade II listed.

The parkland, area of about 35 hectares (86 acres), is on rising ground to the north of the house. It was probably laid out when Arley Castle was built.

=== Gardens and arboretum ===
The gardens and arboretum lie to the north-west of the house. Of the four compartments of the kitchen gardens, dating from the 18th and 19th centuries, the south-east compartment was developed in the 1960s into the Italian garden.

The magnolia garden, created in the 1960s, lies to the north of the kitchen gardens. It has twelve varieties of magnolia.

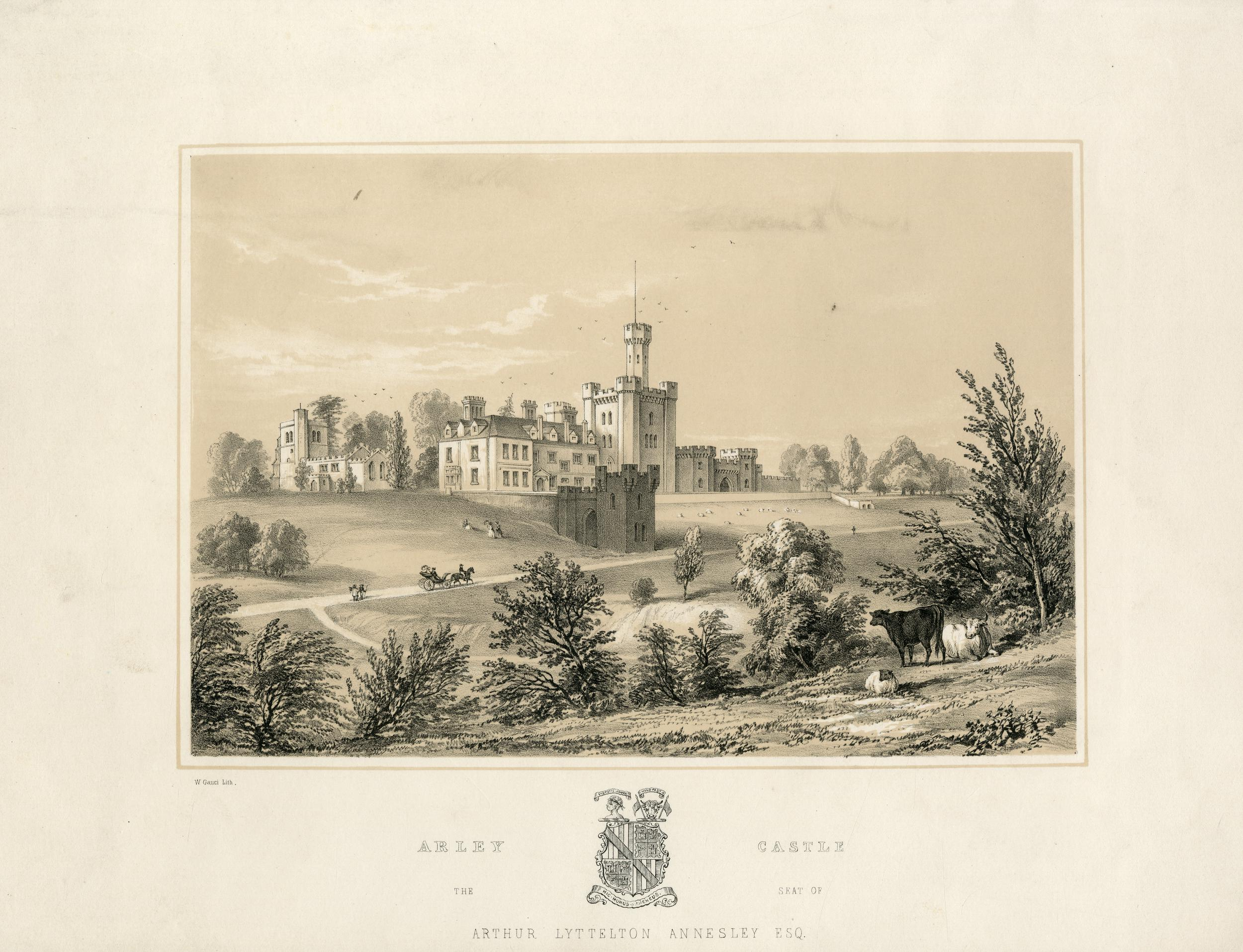
Arley Castle

The arboretum, area 7.6 hectares (19 acres), lies west of the kitchen gardens, and has more than 300 species of trees. The planting of tree began in the early 19th century; after 1852, when the Woodward family purchased the property, many more were added. In the 20th century more trees were planted, a laburnum arch was created, also a heather garden and a camelia avenue. The laburnum arch, extended to 65 metres in 2013, is said to be the longest in Britain. Particularly notable among the tree species is a rare native Sorbus domestica, grown about 1820 from the only specimen then-recorded wild in Britain.
