= West Park, Wolverhampton =

Park in Wolverhampton, West Midlands, England

West Park
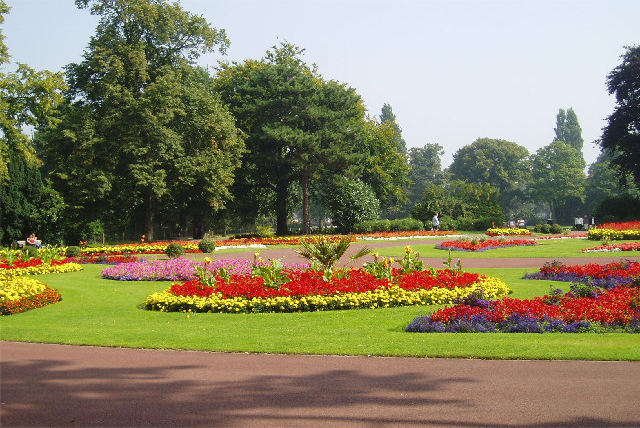
- Formal flower beds, West Park, Wolverhampton
- Interactive map of West Park
- Type: Public park
- Location: Wolverhampton, England
- Coordinates: 52°35′22.8″N 2°8′23.2″W
- Area: 17 hectares (42 acres)
- Created: 1881
- Operator: City of Wolverhampton Council
- Status: 24\7
- Website: West Park

Formerly called the People's Park, Wolverhampton's West Park was opened on 6 June 1881.

It is Grade II* listed in Historic England's Register of Parks and Gardens.

== Background ==
The site chosen for the first of the large parks in Wolverhampton was the Race Course, or Broad Meadows, owned by the Duke of Cleveland. On 12 March 1879, Alderman Samuel Dickinson invited landscape gardeners to compete for the layout of the park. The winner of the £50 prize was Richard Hartland Vertegans of Chad Valley Nurseries, Edgbaston, Birmingham. This was several years before Vertegans designed Victoria Park, Handsworth, Birmingham. The remit from the council included:

- Ornamental lakes, 8 acres
- Areas for volunteer drill, archery, cricket and bowls, 12 acres

The park was opened on 6 June 1881 by the Mayor of Wolverhampton, Alderman John Jones.

The bandstand was presented by the town's long serving M.P., Rt. Hon. Charles Pelham Villiers, on 29 May 1882. Now Grade II listed, it was restored in 2002 at a cost of £70,000.

The conservatory was opened in July 1896 by the widow of former Mayor Alderman Samuel Dickinson. Built at a cost of £1,500, it had been funded by the 1893 Floral Fêtes, one of a series of annual fêtes held between 1889 and 1939.

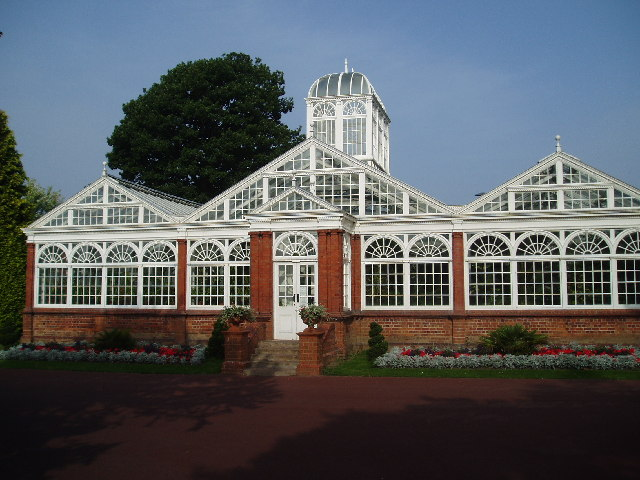
The Conservatory, West Park, Wolverhampton

The largest and most ambitious exhibition held in Wolverhampton was the 1902 Arts and Industrial Exhibition which was sited in West Park. Although housing only one international pavilion, from Canada, the scope and scale of the exhibition mirrored all the advances in other exhibitions of its time. The exhibition site featured several large halls housing machinery, industrial products, a concert hall, two bandstands, a restaurant, and a fun fair with thrill rides and a water chute. Its opening, by the Duke of Connaught, was received with hopeful enthusiasm, unfortunately not matched by the weather, which contributed to a £30,000 loss, equivalent to nearly £2M at today's value.

In 1911, commemorative flower beds were set out for the coronation of King George V; similarly in 1937 for King George VI. During World War I, ducks and rabbits were raised and vegetables were grown to aid the war effort. In 1942, the park was turned into allotments and the normal closing time was extended to allow for the extra work involved. The park was placed on the Heritage National Register of Parks and Gardens of Special Historic Interest in 1986. A grant was received from the Heritage Lottery Fund in 2005 to refurbish the tea room.

== Gallery ==
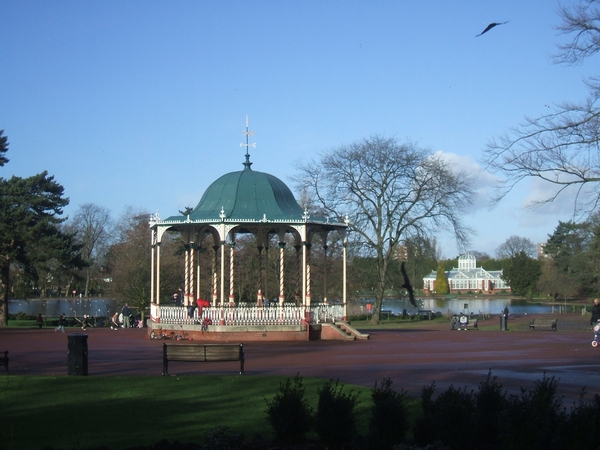
Grade II listed bandstand, 1882

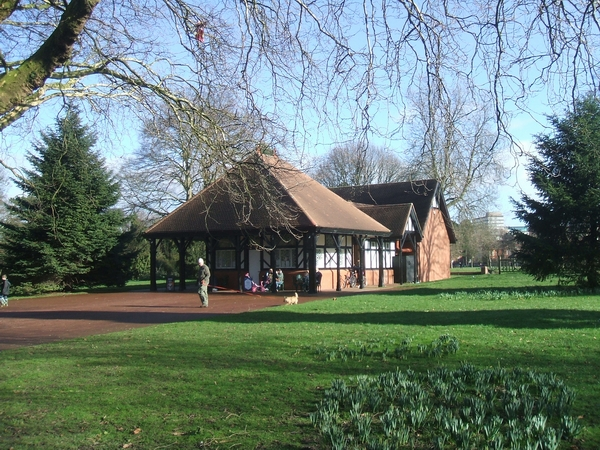
Tea Room, refurbished in 2005

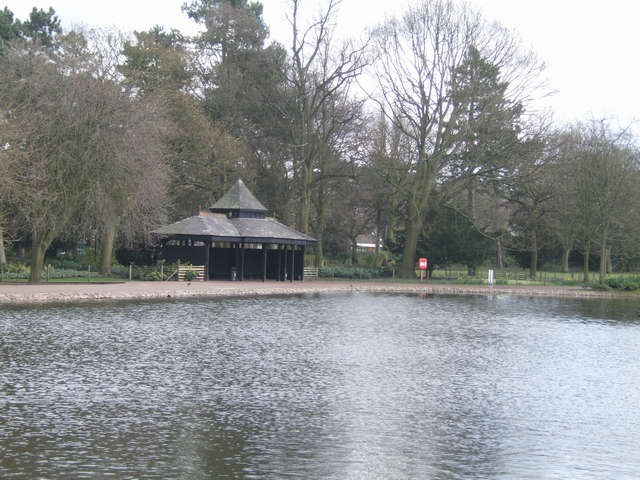
Lakeside pavilion

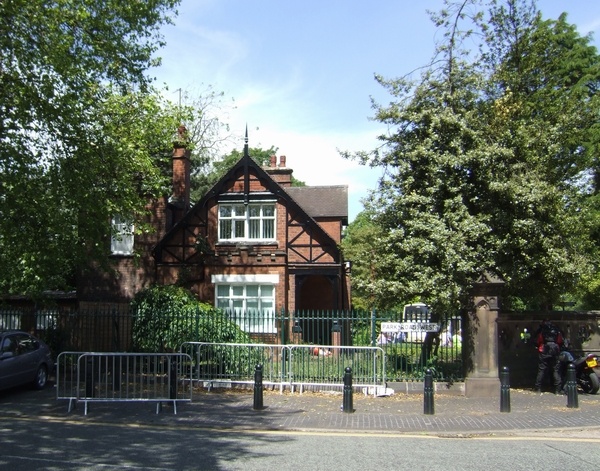
South Gate lodge, West Park

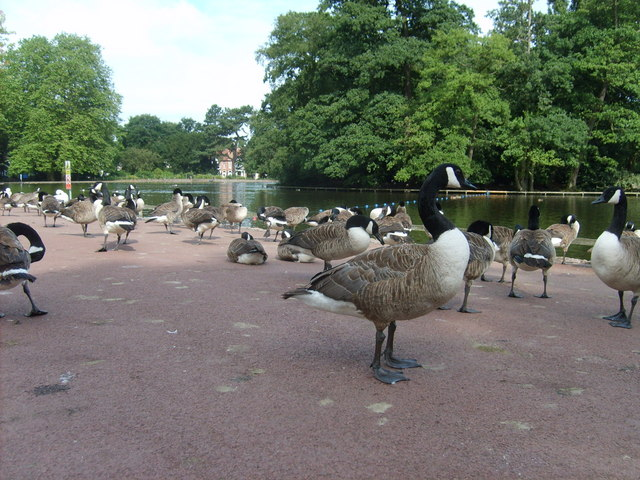
A flock of Canada Geese, Branta Canadensis

== Commonwealth Games 2022 ==
In 2022, West Park hosted the cycling time trials for Birmingham 2022, on Thursday 4 August 2022. The park was the start and finish of the races and the race then going around the city centre and taking in other parts of the Black Country to complete the route. Ian Reid, CEO of Birmingham 2022, said Wolverhampton was the perfect setting for the time trials, as there was plenty of space and incredible support for cycling around the city, and that it was vital to bring the games to the whole of the West Midlands.

== Today ==
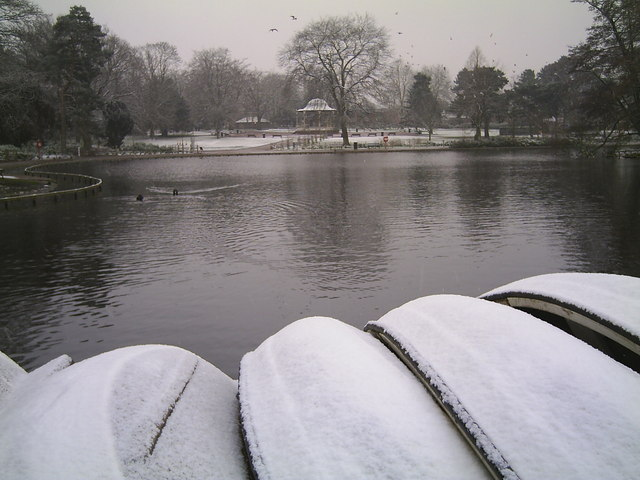
Snow Boats: West Park in winter

Most facilities are free or at nominal cost:

- Wildlife lakes, boats are no longer in operation
- Picnicking
- Tennis courts
- Tearooms
- Children's play area
- Disabled access
- Guide dogs welcome
- Bowling green (situated in Park Crescent)
- Victorian conservatory: global plant collection. No longer open to the public since Covid.

The park hosts:

- Weekly park run
- Various events throughout the summer
