= Victoria Park, Tunstall =

English public park

Victoria Park
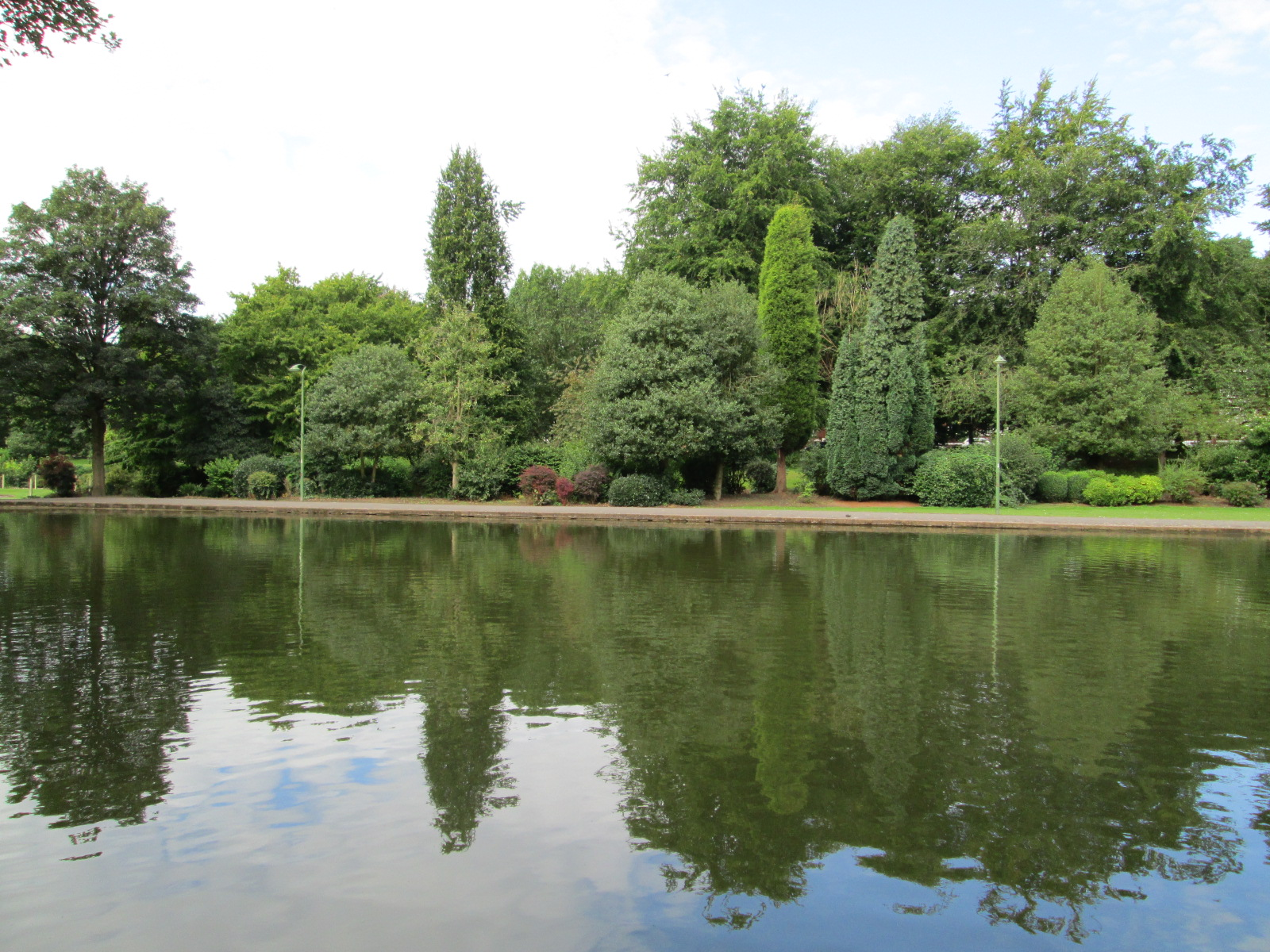
- Interactive map of Victoria Park
- Location: Tunstall, Staffordshire
- OS grid: SJ 86536 51569
- Coordinates: 53°03′40.3″N 2°12′08.5″W
- Area: 8.5 hectares (21 acres)
- Opened: 1908
- Designer: Absalom Reade Wood
- Operator: Stoke-on-Trent City Council
- Designation: Grade II
- Website: www.stoke.gov.uk/directory_record/331202/tunstall_park_victoria_park

Victoria Park is a public park in Tunstall, in Stoke-on-Trent, Staffordshire, England. It is owned and operated by Stoke-on-Trent City Council. Few significant changes have been made since the early 20th century; it is listed Grade II in Historic England's Register of Parks and Gardens.

== History and description ==
The rectangular park, longer from north to south, has an area of 8.5 hectares (21 acres), and is bounded by Victoria Park Road to the west, Queen's Avenue to the south and Little Chell Lane to the north; to the east is Whitfield Greenway, the course of a former mineral railway.

The site for the park, former mine workings, was purchased by Tunstall Urban District Council, and the first sod was turned by the Chief Bailiff on 22 June 1897, marking the Golden Jubilee of Queen Victoria. The park was designed by the council surveyor, Absalom Reade Wood (1851–1922); he had an architect's practice in Tunstall, and designed buildings in the town including the Town Hall and the Queen Victoria Jubilee Buildings, which contained a library and public baths.

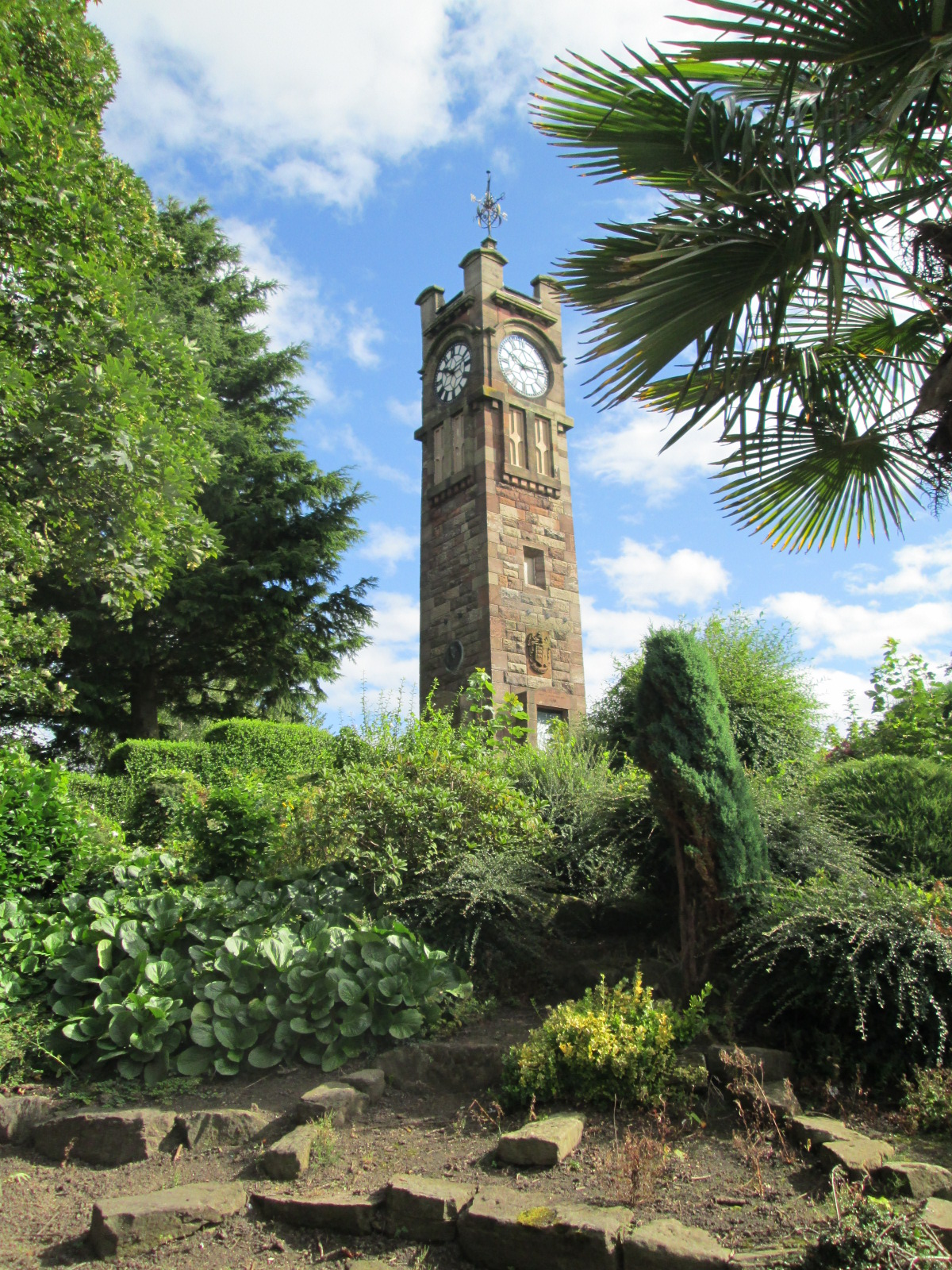
The clock tower

Work progressed over several years. The boating lake and boathouse, bowing greens and tennis courts were completed by 1904. A clock tower was erected in 1907, donated in memory of William Adams (1833–1905), a pottery owner, by employees of his company. The tower stands on the south-west corner of an artificial terrace, on which there is a lawn containing rose beds and bordered by balustrades.

The official opening took place on 18 June 1908, when the main gates, at the south-west corner of the park, were opened; the wrought-iron carriage gates, with an ornamental overthrow, were made in memory of Thomas Peake.

=== Later features ===
A pavilion, built in Arts and Crafts style, was completed in 1911; it was later named the Floral Hall, and is now a café. A rockery and cascade near the northern boundary of the park were constructed about 1960.

Refurbishment of the boathouse, bandstand and park gates, the renewal of footpaths and improvements to the play area, were carried out in 2020.

Facilities include tennis courts, basketball courts, a playing field and outdoor gym equipment; there is a nature trail and wildflower areas. The lake has several species of water fowl including mallard, goosander, coot and moorhen.
