= Warley Woods =

Public park in Warley, England

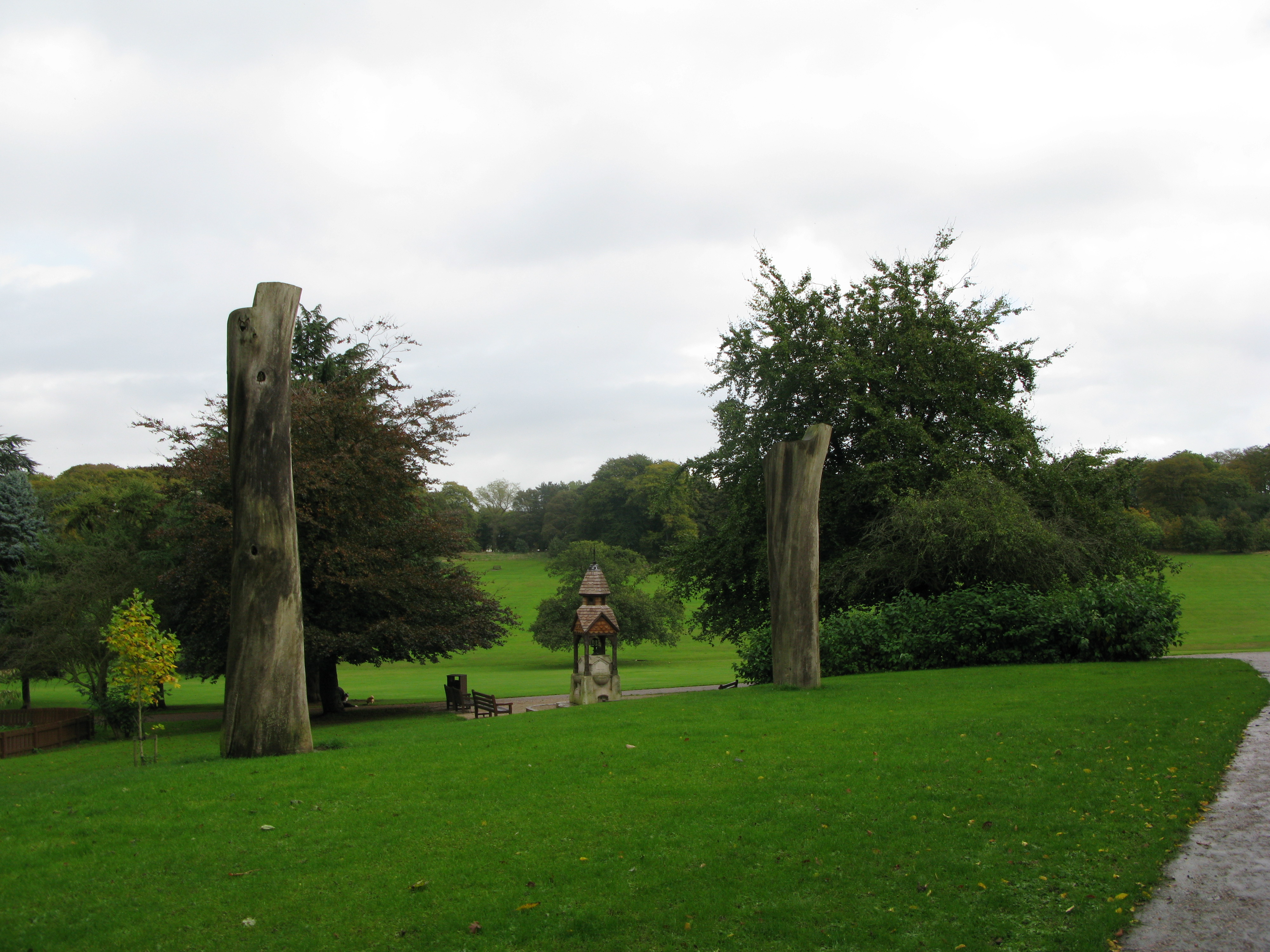
- Warley Woods in 2013
- Interactive map of Warley Woods
- Type: Public park
- Location: Warley, Smethwick, Sandwell, West Midlands, England
- Coordinates: 52.47299°N 1.98260°W
- Area: 100 acres (40 ha)
- Created: 1906
- Operator: Warley Woods Community Trust
- Designation: Grade II listed

Warley Woods (sometimes known as Warley Park, or Warley Woods Park) is a 100-acre (40 ha) public park in the Warley district of Smethwick, in Sandwell, in the West Midlands of England, originally laid out by Humphry Repton. It has been grade II listed by English Heritage in their Register of Historic Parks and Gardens of special historic interest since September 1994.

== Geography ==
The park lies approximately 3 miles (5 km) west of the Birmingham City Centre and occupies a small valley north of the A456 road between Birmingham and Halesowen, just outside the city boundary.

Approximately one-third of the site is mature woodland. The western part of the park is given over to a nine-hole golf course. The small stream which once ran through the site is now filled in. The park holds a Green Flag Award.

== History ==
Warley Hall may have been established after the dissolution of the monasteries in 1538.

The estate which now forms the park was purchased by Samuel Galton, Jr., then living at nearby Great Barr Hall, in the 1790s. At the time, it was in Staffordshire. He commissioned Humphry Repton to landscape the fields and ordered the building of a new house to designs by the architect, Robert Lugar, in gothic style. The house was occupied by his son Hubert, in 1819 and in the 1880s by H.G. Reid, the one time Member of Parliament for Aston Manor. It was described as having a mixture of architectural styles; a little Elizabethan and Gothic with an "abundance of turrets, everywhere". The land was purchased by Birmingham City Council in 1902 and opened as a park in 1906.

Repton first visited the site in 1794. His designs, in the form of a Red Book typical of his work, and submitted in March 1795, are now held by Sandwell Archives. They were largely complied with, albeit some modifications were made.

The house, known locally as "Warley Abbey", despite having no religious function, was demolished in 1957.

== Community Trust ==
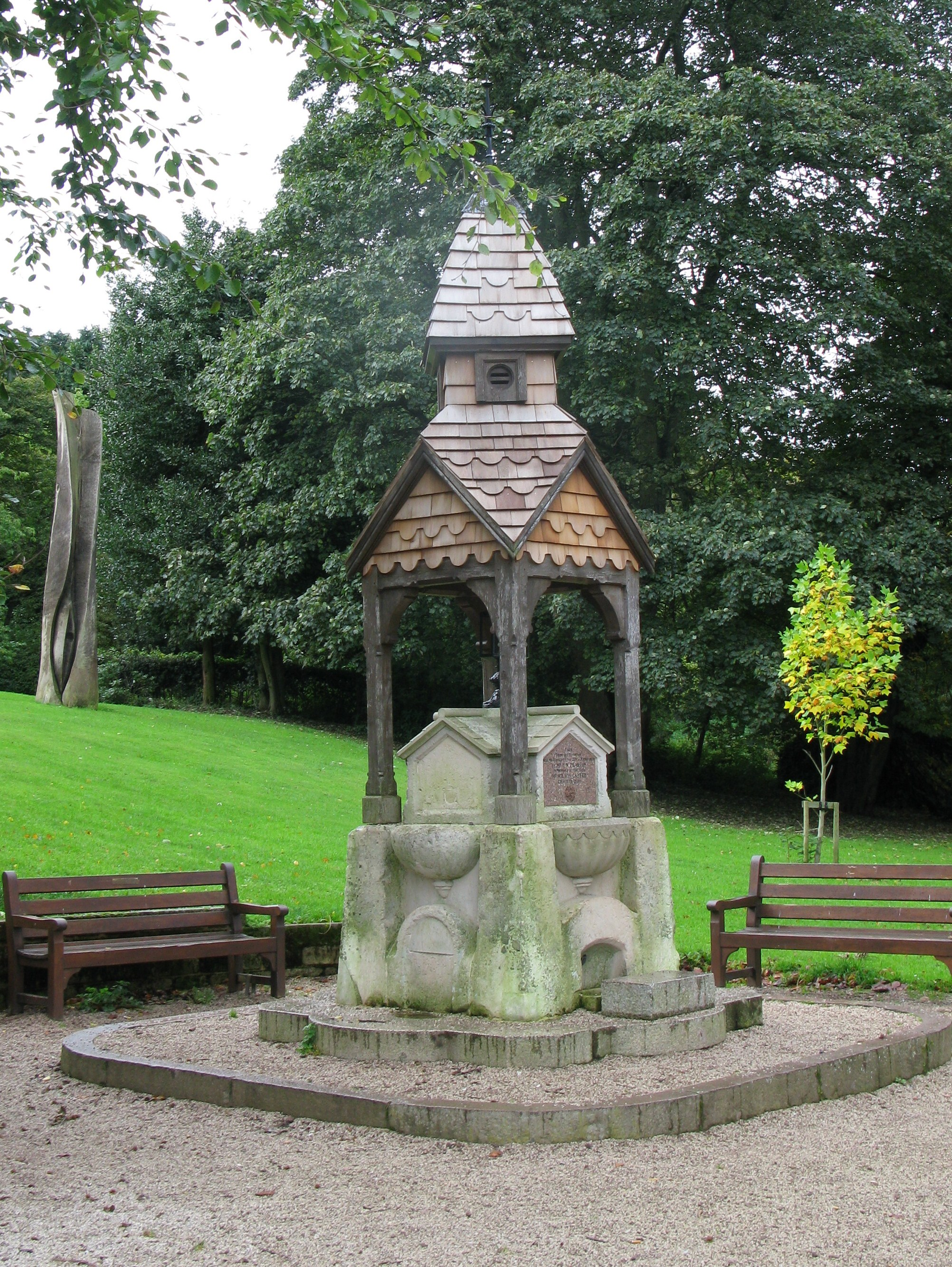
The Edwardian drinking fountain in 2013

The park is now managed by Warley Woods Community Trust, a voluntary organisation and registered charity which leases the land from Sandwell Metropolitan Borough Council, who in turn lease it from Birmingham City Council. At the time of the Trust's creation it was the only charity in England to have responsibility for an Urban Park. It holds the park on a 99-year lease. The park is governed by its own set of byelaws.

The trust operates a building, The Pavilion, at the southern end of the park. This houses the trust's offices, a café, a public meeting room, toilets, and a golf shop. Another of the park's features is a drinking fountain installed in 1907. This was restored in 2009.

The Trust's patrons are the actors Julie Walters and Colin Buchanan, the DJ and Presenter Stuart Maconie and local historian Carl Chinn.
