= Brunswick Park, Wednesbury =

Public park in Wednesbury, England

Brunswick Park
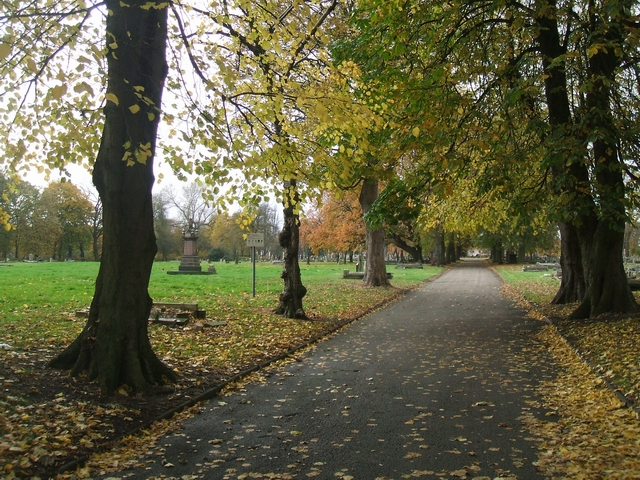
- Interactive map of Brunswick Park
- Location: Wednesbury, West Midlands
- OS grid: SO 99494 95419
- Coordinates: 52°33′23.8″N 2°00′32.0″W
- Area: 8 hectares (20 acres)
- Opened: 1887
- Designer: William Barron
- Operator: Sandwell Metropolitan Borough Council
- Designation: Grade II
- Website: friendsofbrunswickpark.co.uk

Brunswick Park is a public park in Wednesbury, in West Midlands, England, about 1 kilometre (0.6 mi) east of the town centre. It is owned and operated by Sandwell Metropolitan Borough Council. It was opened in 1887, and is listed Grade II in Historic England's Register of Parks and Gardens.

== History and description ==
The site was purchased in 1886 by Wednesbury Urban District Council from the Patent Shaft and Axletree Company, and was named after the company's Brunswick Ironworks. It was designed by William Barron, known particularly for his work in the grounds of Elvaston Castle. His other works include Abbey Park, Leicester, which a committee from Wednesbury visited before he was commissioned to create the park. Brunswick Park was opened on 21 June 1887 by the Mayor of Wednesbury, Richard Williams, to mark the Golden Jubilee of Queen Victoria.

The area of the park is 8 hectares (20 acres). The main entrance is on Wood Green Road, which is the western boundary of the park; the lodge, of 1887, is adjacent to the gateway. The northern part of the park is open, bordered by trees and with informal paths. The clock, in the north-west, was erected in 1911 to celebrate the Coronation of George V and Mary. The former pit mound in the southern part was retained as a feature; it was landscaped and there are paths leading to the levelled-out summit.

== Facilities ==
Facilities include a bandstand, a children's play area, a skate park, tennis courts, outdoor gym equipment and an area for football and other games.
