= Victoria Park, Tipton =

Public park in Tipton, England

Coordinates: 52.5253°N 2.0624°W

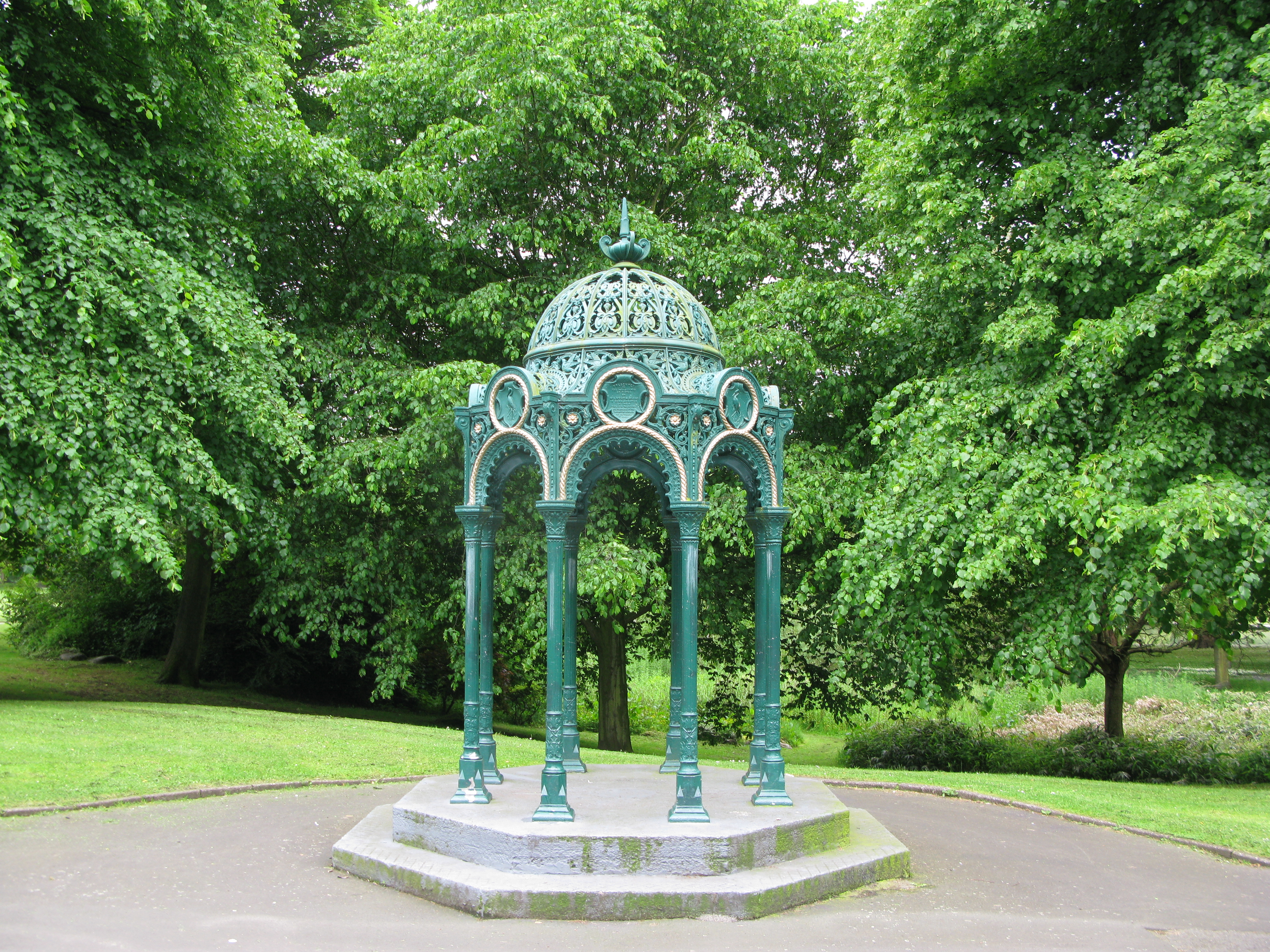
- Victoria Park, Tipton
- Interactive map of Victoria Park, Tipton
- Type: Public Park
- Location: Tipton, West Midlands, England
- Opened: 29 July 1901

Victoria Park is a public park situated in Tipton, West Midlands (formerly Staffordshire), England. It is Grade II listed with the National Register of Historic Parks and Gardens.

== History ==
It was opened on 29 July 1901 and named in honour of Queen Victoria, who had died in January of that year.

860 people in the Tipton area had signed a petition in 1893 for the development of a town park, and after sufficient donations and funding had been made available, development of the park was underway during 1899, although it was not fully complete until just after the official opening.

It was situated on Randalls Lane, Tipton Green, which was promptly renamed Victoria Road. Substantial housing development took place in the vicinity over the next 40 years and most of the houses are still in existence.

The park includes a large lake, tennis courts, children's play area and a Cenotaph which was erected in 1921 in memory of the Tipton men who fallen in the Great War. The names of the Second World War dead were added after that conflict ended in 1945.

A park keeper's bungalow was erected in the 1930s but had fallen into disuse by 1990, finally being demolished in 2005.

Tipton Harriers hold a 5k road race every November in the park.
