= Old Durham Gardens =

Public gardens in Old Durham, County Durham, England

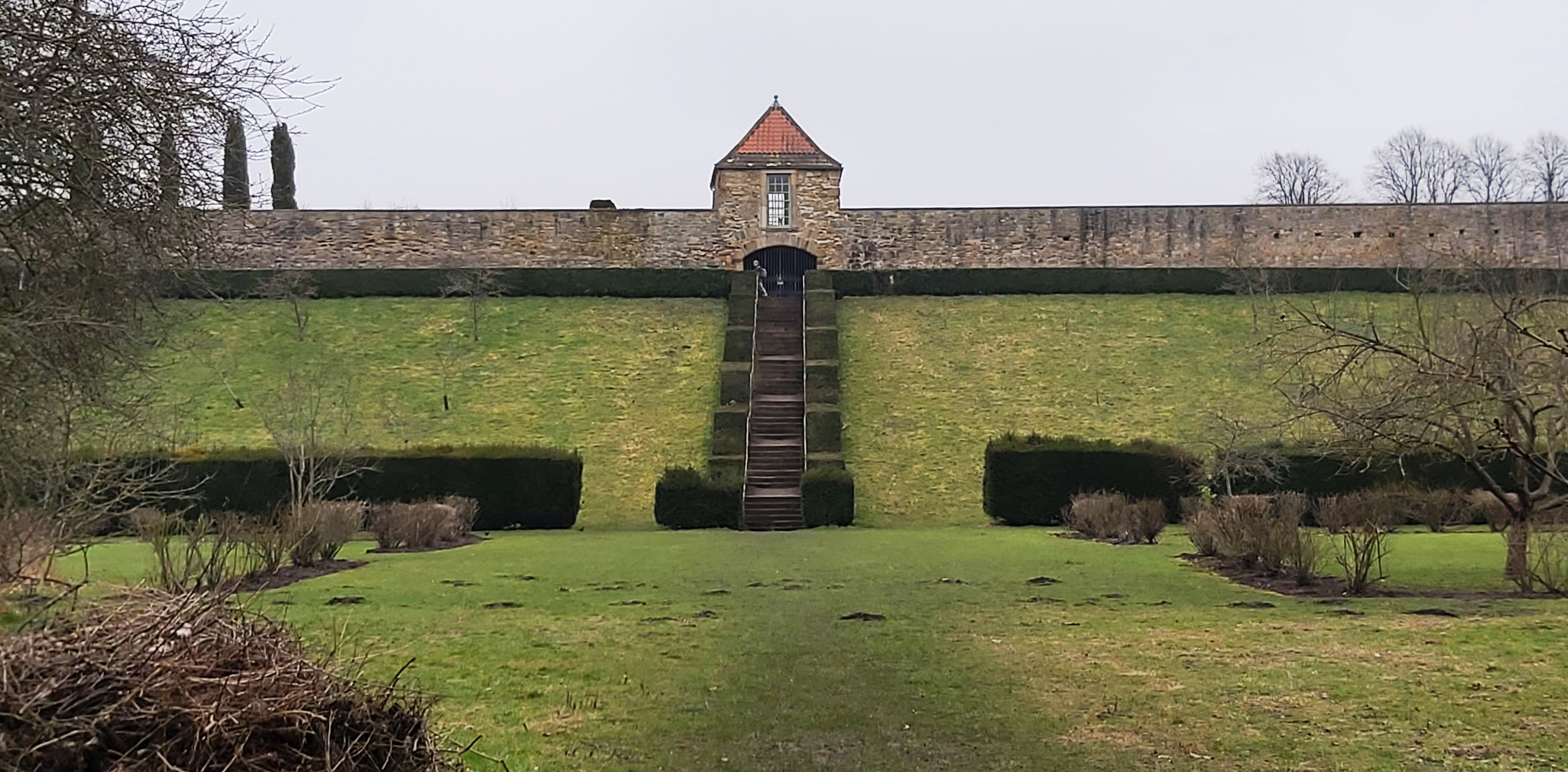
- The gazebo seen from the lower, western part of the gardens
- Interactive map of Old Durham Gardens
- Location: Old Durham, County Durham
- OS grid: NZ 28729 41918
- Coordinates: 54°46′16″N 1°33′18″W
- Designation: Grade II
- Website: olddurhamgardens.co.uk

Old Durham Gardens is a public park in Old Durham, in County Durham, England. It dates from the 17th century, and it is listed Grade II in Historic England's Register of Parks and Gardens.

== History ==
The estate, first mentioned in the 12th century, was appropriated by Robert Neville, Bishop of Durham, in 1443, and given to Kepier Hospital. It was sold during the Dissolution of the Monasteries, and bought in 1569 by John Heath I. The gardens are thought to have been laid out by his descendant John Heath IV between 1630 and his death in 1665, when it passed to his daughter Elizabeth and her husband John Tempest.

The Tempests moved away in 1719, but remained owners of the estate, and continued to use the gardens. They were renovated between 1725 and 1735. The mansion of the estate was demolished before 1776. In 1787 William Hutchinson described the gardens as a place of public recreation, where concerts were held on summer evenings. The visitors were served by the Pineapple Inn, there by the 1820s at the northern edge of the gardens.

The gardens were inherited by Sir Henry Vane-Tempest, 2nd Baronet, in 1794. His descendant Charles Vane-Tempest-Stewart, 7th Marquess of Londonderry sold the gardens and the Pineapple Inn in 1918 to Victor Mazzini Walton, an artist and ice cream maker, and the gardens remained a pleasure ground, with features including tennis courts and a putting green.

Walton sold the gardens and Pineapple Inn in 1949; the inn became a private residence, and the gardens became derelict. In 1985 the gardens were sold to Durham City Council; they were restored, and replanted according to the historic layout. In 1998 they were given listed status, Grade II, in Historic England's Register of Parks and Gardens. To retain the condition of the gardens, the Friends of Old Durham Gardens, a Registered Charity, was established in 2010.

== Description ==
The gardens, area about 1 hectare (2.5 acres), are a short distance east of the River Wear. The lower garden, to the west, is part flat, sloping steeply in the east towards the gazebo and the upper part of the gardens. Steps lead from the lower gardens to the gazebo, which dates from the early 17th century and was remodelled in the early 18th century; this and the adjoining wall at the boundary of the upper garden are Grade II-listed buildings.
