= Castle Bromwich Hall Gardens =

Gardens in West Midlands, England

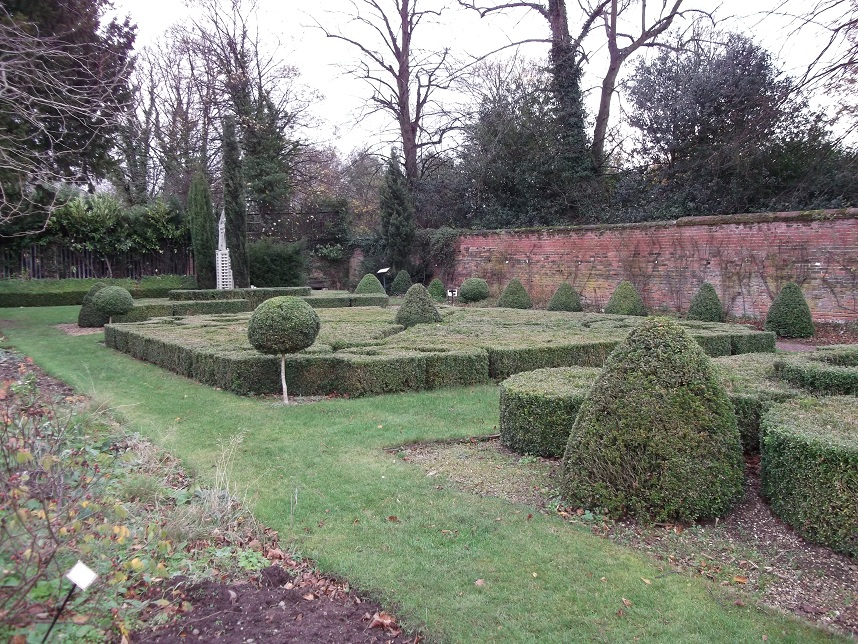
- The Parterre in the North Gardens
- Interactive map of Castle Bromwich Hall Gardens
- Location: Castle Bromwich, Solihull, England
- OS grid: SP142898
- Coordinates: 52.50591°N 1.79222°W
- Area: 10 acres (40,000 m^{2})
- Operator: Castle Bromwich Hall Gardens Trust
- Website: castlebromwichhallgardens.org.uk

Castle Bromwich Hall Gardens are situated adjacent to the west side of Castle Bromwich Hall, a Jacobean mansion. They are in the old centre of Castle Bromwich, a large village in the Metropolitan Borough of Solihull in the West Midlands County of England.

== History ==
The hall was built between 1557 and 1585 by Sir Edward Devereux, the first MP for Tamworth. Sir Orlando Bridgeman bought the Hall and Gardens in 1657 for his son, Sir John Bridgeman I. He made changes to both around the year 1700 advised by his cousin, Captain William Winde. The gardens were designed as a formal arrangement of self-contained garden areas. Some of these were ornamental and some working. They were separated by walls, hedges or level-changes at terraces. On the death of Sir John Bridgeman I in 1710 his son, Sir John Bridgeman II, continued to extend the gardens westwards until they reached their present size of 10 acres (40,000 m^{2}). He also improved the Hall.

The Gardens were developed by further generations of the family, later to become the Earls of Bradford. Lady Ida Bridgeman was the last member of the family to live at the Hall before her death in 1936 and the Gardens were well looked after again under her care. The Hall was then rented out and they fell into decline. A planning application for housing construction was submitted in 1982 but the planning inspectors employed by West Midlands County Council at that time realized the importance of the Gardens and resisted development. The housing proposal went to appeal and was refused. It was decided that restoration was essential and work started to clear the undergrowth and repair the damage caused by vandals. The Castle Bromwich Hall Gardens Trust was formed to restore and maintain them. In 1986 the Gardens and adjoining parkland were listed as Grade II*.

== Features ==
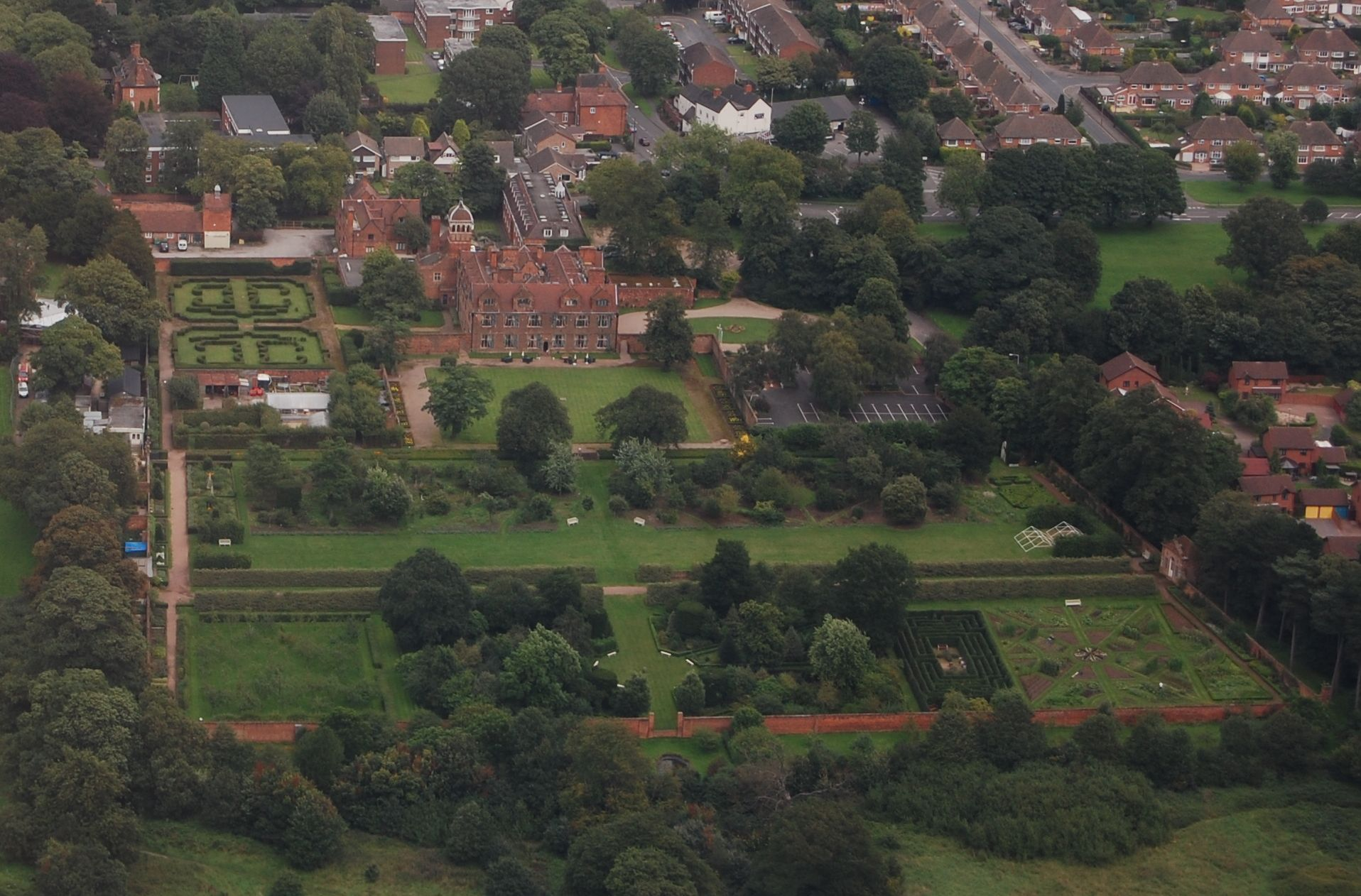
The hall and gardens from the air, August 2012

These 10 acres (40,000 m^{2}) walled Baroque gardens are listed grade II* and are the only remaining example in the country of a formal English garden design. They are being restored as near as possible to the period 1680–1740, which was when they were at their best, and contain over 600 species of plants from the time.

The 100m Holly Walk or Holly Maze is a mirror image of the one at Hampton Court Palace designed by George London and Henry Wise. The Kitchen and Fruit garden is based on a design by Batty Langley from his book "New Principles of Gardening".

== Access ==
The Hall and other buildings are privately owned. Castle Bromwich Hall itself is now a hotel. All buildings and the gardens closest to the house can be seen from the Gardens or roads. The 30 acres (12 ha) of parkland are now a nature reserve managed by Birmingham City Council and the Gardens Trust, and can be accessed free of charge.
