= Register of Historic Parks and Gardens of Special Historic Interest in England =

English listing and classification system

The Register of Historic Parks and Gardens of Special Historic Interest in England provides a listing and classification system for historic parks and gardens similar to that used for listed buildings. The register was set up by Historic England under the provisions of the National Heritage Act 1983. Over 1,600 sites are listed, ranging from the grounds of large stately homes to small domestic gardens, as well other designed landscapes such as town squares, public parks, and cemeteries. The register is published on the National Heritage List for England alongside other national heritage designations.

== Purpose ==
The register aims to "celebrate designed landscapes of note, and encourage appropriate protection", so safeguarding the features and qualities of key landscapes for the future. It is hoped that listing sites of special interest will increase awareness of their value and encourage those who own them, or who have a part to play in their protection, to treat the sites with due care, whether this is a question of carrying out appropriate maintenance or making changes to the site.

If a park or garden has been registered using the designation process under the National Heritage Act 1983 it has legal protection. Registration is a material consideration in the planning process so, following a planning application for development which would affect a registered park or garden, local planning authorities must take into account the historic interest of the site when deciding whether or not to grant permission for any changes. Although the inclusion brings no additional statutory controls in itself, English local authorities are required by government to take the protection of the historic environment into account in their policies and resource allocations. If material changes are made to a registered park or garden without having been granted planning permission first, local planning authorities may require that the changes are undone and, in extreme cases, a prosecution may result.

The register is also used in influencing management decisions, to improve public awareness of important parks and elements within them and to encourage their owners to preserve and maintain them. Gardening and landscape design have long been important preoccupations to the British and, although a wealth of historic parks and gardens exist, they are a fragile and finite resource: they can easily be damaged beyond repair or lost forever.

Since 1995, the Garden History Society has been a statutory consultee in relation to planning proposals which affect historic designed landscapes identified by Historic England as being of national significance and which are included on the Register of Parks and Gardens of Special Historic Interest in England. This means that when a planning authority receives a planning application which affects a site on the Register, or the setting of such a site, the planning authority must consult the Garden History Society. This applies to registered sites of all grades. In addition, Historic England must be consulted where a planning proposal affects a site which is included on the Register at Grade I or Grade II*.

== Register ==
An online searchable register of all registered parks and gardens that are legally protected through the designation system, has been incorporated into the National Heritage List for England currently available through the Historic England website. This shows the relevant list entry which describes the park or garden, and shows where it is on a map. Not all designated parks and gardens are open to the public. Information on historic parks and gardens can also be searched online via Parks & Gardens UK (a partnership between the Association of Gardens Trusts and the University of York). This site does not claim to have any statutory authority and includes a wider range of sites across the UK.

== Eligibility ==
Eligibility for the register is based around documentary research and field survey which attempts to classify and date each park according to set criteria. These are:

- Parks and gardens with a main phase of development prior to 1750 even when only a small part is still evident.
- Sites with a main phase of development dating to between 1750 and 1820 where enough of the park or garden's landscape survives to reflect the original design.
- Sites with a main phase of development between 1820 and 1880 which is deemed important and survives relatively intact.
- Sites with a main phase of development between 1880 and 1939 where this is of high importance and survives intact.
- Sites with a main phase of development laid out since the Second World War, but are more than 30 years old, where the park or garden is of exceptional importance.
- Sites influential in the development of taste whether through repute or literary references.
- Sites which are early or representative examples of a style of layout, or type, or the work of a landscape architect of national importance.
- Sites with an association with significant people or historical events.
- Sites with strong group value, as with some listed buildings.

As with listed buildings, parks and gardens are graded on a scale, Grade I being internationally significant sites are therefore the most important and constitute around 10% of the total number. Historically important gardens are Grade II* (about 30% of the total) and the remainder are of regional or national importance and are Grade II registered.

== Other parts of the United Kingdom ==
Separate registers of parks, gardens and designed landscapes are maintained in the other countries of the United Kingdom:

- The Cadw/ICOMOS Register of Parks and Gardens of Special Historic Interest in Wales is maintained by Cadw
- The Inventory of Gardens and Designed Landscapes in Scotland is maintained by Historic Environment Scotland
- The Register of Parks, Gardens and Demesnes of Special Historic Interest is maintained by the Northern Ireland Environment Agency

== See also ==
- List of sites on the National Register of Historic Parks and Gardens
- List of English Heritage properties
- List of heritage registers
- Historic garden conservation
