= Listed parks and gardens in the East Midlands =

The Register of Historic Parks and Gardens of Special Historic Interest in England, created in 1983, is administered by Historic England. It includes more than 1,600 sites, ranging from gardens of private houses, to cemeteries and public parks.

There are 149 registered parks and gardens in the East Midlands. 16 are listed at grade I, the highest grade, 40 at grade II*, the middle grade, and 93 at grade II, the lowest grade.

== Key ==
Grade	Criteria
I	Parks and gardens of exceptional interest, sometimes considered to be internationally important
II*	Particularly important parks and gardens of more than special interest
II	Parks and gardens of national importance and special interest

== Parks and gardens ==
=== Derbyshire ===
Name	Grade	Location	Type	Completed (Note: The date given is the date used by Historic England as significant for the initial building or that of an important part in the structure's description.)	Grid ref. (Note: The grid reference is based on the British national grid reference system, sometimes known as OSGB36, used by the Ordnance Survey.) Geo-coordinates	Entry number (Note: The "List Entry Number" is a unique number assigned to each listed building and scheduled monument by Historic England.)	Image
Barlborough Hall	II	Barlborough	Garden	16th century	SK 48078 78122	1001365	Barlborough Hall
Belper Cemetery	II	Belper	Cemetery	1859	SK 35143 49019	1000201	Belper Cemetery
Bolsover Castle	I	Old Bolsover	Garden	1640	SK 47106 70512	1000674	Bolsover Castle
Bretby Hall	II	Hartshorne	Garden	Early 18th century	SK 30041 22311	1001382	Bretby Hall
Calke Abbey	II*	Calke	Garden	Early 19th century	SK 36523 22683	1000676	Calke Abbey
Chatsworth House	I	Beeley	Garden	Early 19th century	SK 25318 69986	1000355	Chatsworth House More images
Derby Arboretum	II*	Derby	Park	1840	SK 35583 34949	1000677	Derby Arboretum
Derwent Gardens	II	Matlock Bath	Park	1890s	SK 29480 57974	1001415	Derwent Gardens More images
Ednaston Manor	II	Brailsford	Garden	1919	SK 23800 42188	1000678	Ednaston Manor
Elvaston Castle	II*	Elvaston	Garden	1851	SK 41482 32897	1000404	Elvaston Castle
Haddon Hall	I	Nether Haddon	Garden	17th century	SK 23616 66209	1000679	Haddon Hall
Hardwick Hall	I	Ault Hucknall	Garden	1590s	SK 46496 64072	1000450	Hardwick Hall More images
Heights of Abraham	II*	Matlock Bath	Garden	1787	SK 29181 58568	1000680	Heights of Abraham
High Tor	II*	Matlock Town	Promenade	19th century	SK 29791 58838	1001417	High Tor
Howard Park	II	Glossop	Park	1888	SK 03061 94968	1001517	Howard Park More images
Kedleston Hall	I	Weston Underwood	Garden	1775	SK3056540741	1000451	Kedleston Hall
Locko Park	II	Stanley and Stanley Common	Garden	Mid 19th century	SK 40903 38561	1000681	Locko Park More images
Lovers' Walks	II*	Cromford	Promenade	1740s	SK 29531 58055	1001416	Lovers' Walks
Melbourne Hall	I	Melbourne	Garden	1710	SK3880024867	1000682	Melbourne Hall
Nottingham Road Cemetery	II	Derby	Cemetery	1855	SK 37269 36494	1001610	Nottingham Road Cemetery
Old Cemetery	II	Derby	Cemetery	1843	SK 34147 35857	1000787	Old Cemetery
Pavilion Gardens	II*	Buxton	Park	1871	SK 05296 73313	1000675	Pavilion Gardens
Queen's Park	II*	Chesterfield	Park	1887	SK 37879 70804	1001482	Queen's Park
Renishaw Hall	II*	Eckington	Garden	Early 20th century	SK4345978378	1000683	Renishaw Hall
River Gardens	II*	Belper	Park	1905	SK 34689 48249	1001372	River Gardens More images
The Slopes	II	Buxton	Park	1818	SK 05818 73467	1001456	The Slopes More images
Sudbury Hall	II	Sudbury	Garden	1837	SK 16131 33493	1000684	Sudbury Hall More images
Swarkestone Old Hall	II*	Swarkestone	Garden	Early 17th century	SK 37360 28481	1000685	Swarkestone Old Hall
Sydnope Hall	II	Darley Dale	Garden	1850s	SK 29582 63923	1001273	Sydnope Hall
Thornbridge Hall	II	Ashford in the Water	Garden	Early 20th century	SK 20013 70842	1001275	Thornbridge Hall
Whitworth Institute	II	Darley Dale	Park	1890	SK 27301 62782	1001274	Whitworth Institute
Willersley Castle	II	Cromford	Garden	Early 19th century	SK 29760 57311	1001459	Willersley Castle

=== Leicestershire ===
Name	Grade	Location	Type	Completed	Grid ref. Geo-coordinates	Entry number	Image
Abbey Park	II*	Leicester	Park	1882	SK 58645 05745	1000956	Abbey Park More images
Baggrave Hall	II	South Croxton	Garden	Early 19th century	SK 69731 08857	1000482	Baggrave Hall
Belgrave Hall	II	Belgrave	Garden	1721	SK 59260 07200	1001620	Belgrave Hall
Bradgate Park	II	Newtown Linford	Park	19th century	SK 53234 10509	1000958	Bradgate Park
Coleorton Hall	II*	Worthington	Garden	Early 19th century	SK 39564 17378	1000959	Coleorton Hall
Garendon Park	II	Stonebow Village	Garden	1730s	SK 49973 19319	1000379	Garendon Park
Langton Hall	II	West Langton	Garden	18th century	SP 71655 92637	1000961	Langton Hall
Lowesby Hall	II	Lowesby	Garden	1910	SK 72109 07772	1000962	Lowesby Hall More images
Nevill Holt Hall	II	Medbourne	Garden	17th century	SP 81716 93585	1001433	Nevill Holt Hall
New Walk	II	Leicester	Promenade	1785	SK 58781 04111	1000963	New Walk
Prestwold Hall	II	Prestwold	Garden	1842	SK 58020 21413	1000964	Prestwold Hall
Quenby Hall	II	Hungarton	Garden	Early 20th century	SK 70178 06272	1000965	Quenby Hall
Saffron Hill Cemetery	II*	Leicester	Cemetery	1931	SP 58954 99730	1001571	Saffron Hill Cemetery
Stanford Hall	II	Westrill and Starmore	Garden	Mid 18th century	SP5829480297	1000509	Stanford Hall
Staunton Harold Hall	II*	Staunton Harold	Garden	1760s	SK3780621223	1000493	Staunton Harold Hall
Stapleford Park	II	Freeby	Garden	1770s	SK8123917680	1000966	Stapleford Park
Victoria Park	II	Leicester	Park	1883	SK 59707 03139	1000967	Victoria Park More images
Welford Road Cemetery	II	Leicester	Cemetery	1849	SK 59153 03063	1001376	Welford Road Cemetery
Whatton House	II	Kegworth	Garden	Late 19th century	SK 49268 24123	1000968	Whatton House

=== Lincolnshire ===
Name	Grade	Location	Type	Completed	Grid ref. Geo-coordinates	Entry number	Image
Aswarby Park	II	Aswarby	Garden	Late 19th century	TF0613540203	1441825	Aswarby Park
Ayscoughfee Hall	II	Spalding	Park	1902	TF2489022329	1000969	Ayscoughfee Hall
Belton House	I	Londonthorpe and Harrowby Without	Garden	Late 19th century	SK 93879 38557	1000460	Belton House
Belvoir Castle	II*	Grantham	Garden	Early 19th century	SK8247232173	1000957	Belvoir Castle
Boston Cemetery	II	Boston	Cemetery	1854	TF 32717 45594	1000935	Boston Cemetery
Boultham Park	II	Lincoln	Park	Early 19th century	SK 96429 68877	1000970	Boultham Park
Brocklesby Park	I	Caistor	Garden	Early 20th century	TA 12710 03425	1000971	Brocklesby Park
Caythorpe Court	II	Caythorpe	Garden	1903	SK 95783 48272	1000972	Caythorpe Court
Coleby Hall	II	Coleby	Garden	Late 18th century	SK 97438 60800	1000973	Coleby Hall
Culverthorpe Hall	II	Culverthorpe and Kelby	Garden	1912	TF 01829 40076	1000974	Culverthorpe Hall
Doddington Hall	II*	Doddington and Whisby	Garden	1900	SK 89782 70152	1000975	Doddington Hall
Easton Park	II	Colsterworth	Garden	1840s	SK 93073 25878	1000976	Easton Park
Fillingham Castle	II	Ingham	Garden	1770	SK 95524 86606	1000977	Fillingham Castle
Greatford Hall	II	Greatford	Park and garden	Late 18th century	TF0855811502	1441359	Greatford Hall
Grimsthorpe Castle	I	Little Bytham	Garden	1771	TF 03333 18732	1000978	Grimsthorpe Castle
Gunby Hall	II	Candlesby with Gunby	Garden	18th century	TF 46752 66820	1000979	Gunby Hall
Hackthorn Hall	II	Hackthorn	Garden	1795	SK 98856 82276	1000980	Hackthorn Hall
Hainton Hall	II	Hainton	Garden	1780s	TF1794884064	1000981	Hainton Hall
Harlaxton Manor	II*	Harlaxton	Garden	Mid 19th century	SK 89247 32728	1000982	Harlaxton Manor
Harrington Hall	II	Harrington	Garden	19th century	TF3655771679	1000983	Harrington Hall
Hartsholme Park	II	Lincoln	Garden	1862	SK 94447 69453	1000984	Hartsholme Park
Holywell Hall Park	II	Careby	Garden	1760s	TF0000416056	1444034	Holywell Hall Park
Lincoln Arboretum	II	Lincoln	Arboretum	1872	SK 98449 71498	1000985	Lincoln Arboretum
Marston Hall	II	Marston	Garden	18th century	SK 89314 43662	1000986	Marston Hall
Norton Place	II	Bishop Norton	Park and garden	1772	SK9749190661	1470334	Norton Place
Petwood Hotel Gardens	II	Woodhall Spa	Garden	1912	TF1923063745	1442113	Petwood Hotel Gardens
Rauceby Hospital	II	Silk Willoughby	Hospital grounds	1902	TF 04111 44075	1001471	Rauceby Hospital
Revesby Abbey	II	Revesby	Garden	1846	TF3065362417	1000988	Revesby Abbey
Riseholme Hall	II	Riseholme	Garden	Mid 18th century	SK 98236 75491	1000989	Riseholme Hall
Scrivelsby Court	II	Scrivelsby	Garden	1790s	TF 26912 66179	1000990	Scrivelsby Court
Skegness Esplanade and Tower Gardens	II	Skegness	Park	1922	TF5699163260	1443891	Skegness Esplanade and Tower Gardens
South Ormsby Park	II	South Ormsby	Garden	Mid 18th century	TF3650475427	1442321	South Ormsby Park
South Rauceby Hall	II	North Rauceby	Garden	1843	TF 02919 45821	1000987	South Rauceby Hall
Stoke Rochford Hall	II*	Great Ponton	Garden	Mid 19th century	SK 91875 28286	1000991	Stoke Rochford Hall
Uffington Park	II	Uffington	Garden	Mid 19th century	TF0568607445	1470336	Uffington Park
Well Hall	II	Claxby St Andrew	Garden	Early 18th century	TF4430973380	1000992	Well Hall

=== Northamptonshire ===
Name	Grade	Location	Type	Completed	Grid ref. Geo-coordinates	Entry number	Image
All Saints Manor	II	Barnwell	Garden	17th century	TL 04803 84363	1001027	Upload Photo
Althorp	II*	Brington	Garden	1863	SP6801165024	1001023	Althorp
Apethorpe Palace	II	Apethorpe	Garden	1900s	TL 02305 95362	1001448	Apethorpe Palace
Ashby St Ledgers	II	Ashby St Ledgers	Garden	1904	SP 57364 68333	1001024	Ashby St Ledgers
Ashton Wold	II	Ashton	Garden	1901	TL 08703 87864	1001715	Ashton Wold
Aynhoe Park	II	Aynho	Garden	1760s	SP5173832458	1001025	Aynhoe Park
Barnwell Manor	II	Barnwell	Garden	1920	TL 05122 85135	1001026	Barnwell Manor
Boughton Hall	II	Boughton	Garden	Late 18th century	SP 75374 66670	1001297	Boughton Hall
Boughton House	I	Brigstock	Park and garden	Early 18th century	SP8987579208	1000375	Boughton House
Brockhall Park	II	Norton	Garden	1800	SP 63078 62623	1001383	Brockhall Park
Canons Ashby	II*	Canons Ashby House	Garden	1710	SP 57276 50154	1000488	Canons Ashby
Castle Ashby House	I	Grendon	Park and garden	1862	SP8576157901	1000385	Castle Ashby House
Cottesbrooke Hall	II	Cottesbrooke	Garden	1938	SP7088574601	1001028	Cottesbrooke Hall
Courteenhall House	II	Courteenhall	Garden	Late 18th century	SP 75981 53197	1001029	Courteenhall House
Deene Park	II	Deenethorpe	Garden	16th century	SP 94661 92038	1001030	Deene Park
Drayton House	I	Lowick	Garden	1700	SP 96403 80083	1001031	Drayton House
Easton Neston house	II*	Easton Neston	Garden	1900	SP 70916 48283	1001032	Easton Neston house
Fawsley Hall	II*	Fawsley	Garden	Mid 18th century	SP5638957238	1001033	Fawsley Hall
Great Harrowden Hall	II*	Great Harrowden	Park and garden	Early 18th century	SP8849671141	1000392	Great Harrowden Hall
Harrington	II*	Harrington	Garden	Late 17th century	SP 77298 80361	1001034	Harrington
Holdenby House	I	Holdenby	Garden	1587	SP 69224 67307	1001035	Holdenby House
Horton Hall	II	Hackleton	Garden	1757	SP 82471 53960	1001316	Horton Hall
Kelmarsh Hall	II*	Kelmarsh	Garden	Mid 20th century	SP 73609 79598	1001712	Kelmarsh Hall
Kirby Hall	II*	Gretton	Garden	1610s	SP 92615 92554	1000116	Kirby Hall
Lamport Hall	II	Lamport	Garden	1923	SP 76019 74355	1001036	Lamport Hall
Lyveden New Bield	I	Benefield	Garden	1590s	SP 98349 85392	1001037	Lyveden New Bield
Rockingham Castle	II*	Cottingham	Garden	17th century	SP8627490319	1001038	Rockingham Castle
Rushton Hall	II*	Rushton	Garden	1909	SP 83469 82597	1001663	Rushton Hall
Stoke Park	II	Shutlanger	Garden	Early 20th century	SP7408848815	1001039	Stoke Park
Sulgrave Manor	II	Sulgrave	Garden	1920s	SP 56066 45593	1001040	Sulgrave Manor More images
Wakefield Lodge	II	Paulerspury	Garden	1750s	SP7350942834	1444577	Wakefield Lodge
Wicksteed Park	II	Kettering	Park	1921	SP 88024 76862	1001524	Wicksteed Park

=== Nottinghamshire ===
Name	Grade	Location	Type	Completed	Grid ref. Geo-coordinates	Entry number	Image
Annesley Hall	II*	Annesley	Garden	1860s	SK 50796 51754	1001077	Annesley Hall
Babworth Hall	II	Retford	Garden	1790s	SK 68740 81069	1001078	Babworth Hall
Bagthorpe Gardens	II*	Nottingham	Garden	1842	SK5681342689	1409803	Bagthorpe Gardens
Bestwood Pumping Station	II	Bestwood Village	Pumping station grounds	1871	SK 57937 48243	1001333	Bestwood Pumping Station
Church Cemetery	II*	Nottingham	Cemetery	1856	SK 56796 41175	1001486	Church Cemetery
Clifton Hall	II	Clifton	Garden	1874	SK 54435 35247	1001692	Clifton Hall
Clumber Park	I	Carburton	Garden	1830s	SK6223475037	1001079	Clumber Park More images
Flintham Hall	II	Flintham	Garden	Early 19th century	SK 73429 46023	1001080	Flintham Hall
General Cemetery	II	Nottingham	Cemetery	1836	SK 56557 40348	1001487	General Cemetery
Highfields Park	II*	Beeston	Park	1923	SK 54195 37892	1001350	Highfields Park
Holme Pierrepont Hall	II	Holme Pierrepont	Garden	1875	SK 62658 39241	1001081	Holme Pierrepont Hall
Hunger Hill Gardens, Stonepit Coppice Gardens and Gorseyclose Gardens	II*	Nottingham	Garden	1840s	SK 57763 41608	1001479	Hunger Hill Gardens, Stonepit Coppice Gardens and Gorseyclose Gardens More images
Jewish Burial Ground	II	Nottingham	Cemetery	1823	SK5699141110	1454260	Jewish Burial Ground
Mansfield Cemetery	II	Mansfield	Cemetery	1857	SK 54054 58892	1001604	Mansfield Cemetery
Memorial Gardens	II	Nottingham	Memorial garden	1927	SK 57848 37810	1001506	Memorial Gardens
Newark Castle Gardens	II	Newark	Park	1889	SK 79664 54038	1001318	Newark Castle Gardens
Newstead Abbey	II*	Newstead	Garden	Late 19th century	SK5388053563	1001082	Newstead Abbey
Nottingham Arboretum	II*	Nottingham	Arboretum	1852	SK 56776 40761	1001083	Nottingham Arboretum
Papplewick Hall	II*	Papplewick	Garden	1780s	SK5416151764	1001084	Papplewick Hall
Papplewick Pumping Station	II	Ravenshead	Pumping station grounds	1884	SK 58300 52115	1001339	Papplewick Pumping Station
Rufford Abbey	II	Rufford	Garden	18th century	SK6480864126	1001085	Rufford Abbey
Shireoaks Hall	II*	Shireoaks	Garden	1617	SK 54567 80255	1000367	Shireoaks Hall
Southwell Workhouse	II*	Upton	Workhouse grounds	1824	SK 71135 54236	1001591	Southwell Workhouse
Stanford Hall	II	Rempstone	Garden	1930s	SK 55766 23904	1001640	Stanford Hall
Thoresby Hall	I	Clumber and Hardwick	Garden	Mid 19th century	SK6360371536	1000361	Thoresby Hall
Welbeck Abbey	II	Norton and Cuckney	Garden	Early 20th century	SK 56610 74062	1000556	Welbeck Abbey
Wollaton Hall	II*	Nottingham	Garden	Late 18th century	SK 53390 39210	1000344	Wollaton Hall

=== Rutland ===
Name	Grade	Location	Type	Completed	Grid ref. Geo-coordinates	Entry number	Image
Burley House	II	Burley	Garden	1796	SK8858708586	1000380	Burley House
Exton Park	II	Cottesmore	Garden	19th century	SK 93201 12250	1000960	Exton Park
