= 1842 in the United Kingdom =

Events from the year 1842 in the United Kingdom.

== Incumbents ==
- Monarch – Victoria
- Prime Minister – Robert Peel (Conservative)
- Foreign Secretary – George Hamilton-Gordon, 4th Earl of Aberdeen
- Home Secretary – Sir James Graham

== Events ==
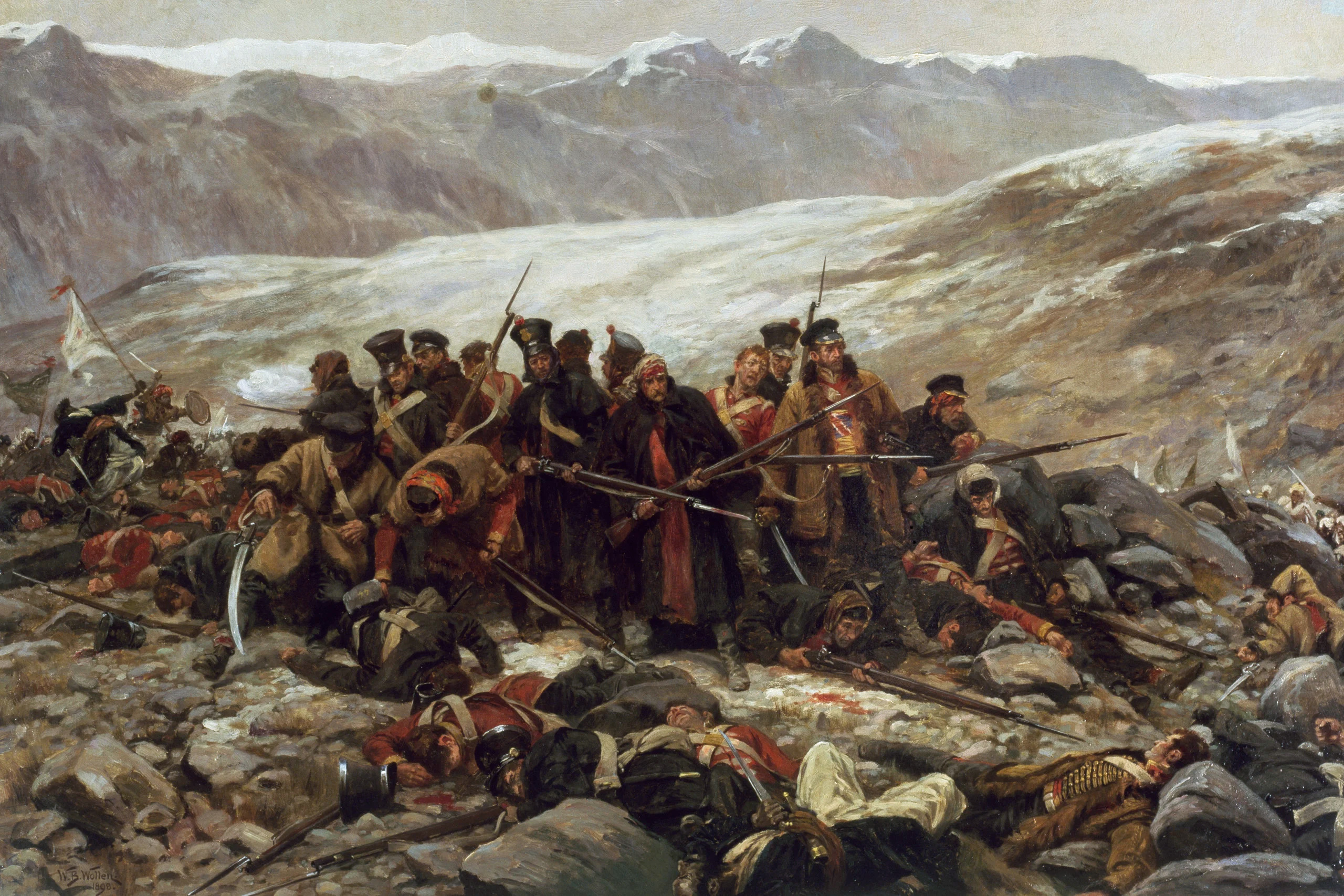
The Last Stand of the 44th Regiment at Gundamuck by William Barnes Wollen, 1898

- 6–13 January – First Anglo-Afghan War – Massacre of Elphinstone's army (Battle of Gandamak) by Afghan forces on the road from Kabul to Jalalabad, Afghanistan, under Akbar Khan, son of Dost Mohammed Khan.
- February – J. H. Newman, the controversial Anglican cleric, withdraws to Littlemore, outside Oxford, and establishes a semi-monastic community, "the house of the Blessed Virgin Mary at Littlemore".
- 31 March – Middleton Junction and Oldham Branch Railway line opened up to Werneth.
- April – 1842 general strike, a series of strikes and uprisings driven by Chartism and opposition to wage cuts and to the Corn Laws, breaks out, initially among Staffordshire coal miners, spreading to other industrial districts and continuing until September.
- 13 April – First Anglo-Afghan War: British victory at the Battle of Jellalabad.
- 25 April – Black Country Nailers' Riots.
- 11 May – Income Tax Act 1842 establishes the first peacetime income tax in Britain; 7 pence on the pound, for incomes over 150 pounds.
- 4 June – In South Africa, hunter Dick King rides into the British military base in Grahamstown to warn that Boers have besieged Durban. He had set out eleven days earlier. The British Army dispatches a relief force.
- 13 June
  - Queen Victoria makes the first train journey by a reigning British monarch, on the Great Western Railway (Slough to Paddington).
  - The half farthing coin is made legal tender in the U.K.
- 19 June – Rebecca Riots: the army suppresses rioters in Carmarthen protesting against turnpike tolls.
- 16 July – Treason Act 1842 amends procedures and penalties against those threatening the monarch's life.
- August–October – First Anglo-Afghan War: British victory at the Battle of Kabul.
- 7–27 August – 1842 general strike: riots in and around Lancashire, spreading to Yorkshire by around 12 August. Because protestors remove plugs from textile mill boilers to prevent them working, these become known as the "Plug Plot Riots".
- 9 August – The United States and United Kingdom sign the Webster-Ashburton Treaty agreeing the border between the United States and Canada.
- 10 August – Mines and Collieries Act 1842 makes it illegal for women and girls of any age, and boys under ten years, to work underground, following the Children's Employment Commission (Mines) report produced in response to the 1838 Huskar Pit disaster (which resulted in the deaths by drowning of 26 children aged 7 to 17).
- 12–13 August – 1842 general strike: Preston Strike of 1842 and Lune Street Riot – 4 demonstrating cotton workers are shot dead by the military.
- 15–16 August – 1842 general strike: 1842 Pottery Riots – one demonstrator in the Staffordshire Potteries is shot dead by the military.
- 16 August – 1842 general strike: in Halifax, West Yorkshire, at least 6 demonstrators are killed by the military.
- 29 August – The United Kingdom and Qing dynasty China sign the Treaty of Nanking, an unequal treaty ending the First Opium War. Hong Kong is ceded to Britain.
- 10 & 19 November – London debtor's prisons the Fleet Prison and Marshalsea are closed and inmates transferred to Queen's Bench Prison. Pentonville Prison for criminals is completed in north London this year.

=== Undated ===
- Pioneering allotments are established in Nottingham: St Ann's Allotments and Bagthorpe Gardens.
- The Lancashire Loom, a semi-automatic power loom for weaving cotton fabric, is invented by James Bullough and William Kenworthy in Blackburn and becomes the mainstay of the Lancashire cotton industry for a century.
- Beecham's Pills (a laxative) first marketed in St Helens, Lancashire by Thomas Beecham, forming the basis of the Beecham Group and GSK plc pharmaceutical companies.
- John Kilner & Co., glass manufacturers, established in Castleford, Yorkshire, to produce the Kilner jar.
- New pattern musket with percussion cap produced to replace the flintlock in the British Army.
- Paleontologist Richard Owen coins the term name Dinosauria, hence the Anglicised dinosaur.
- Antarctic explorer James Clark Ross charts the eastern side of James Ross Island.
- J. M. W. Turner paints Peace – Burial at Sea and Snowstorm – steam boat off a harbour's mouth.

== Publications ==
- 14 May – The Illustrated London News first published.
- Edwin Chadwick's critical Report on an inquiry into the Sanitary Condition of the Labouring Population of Great Britain published by the Poor Law Commission.
- Thomas Babington Macaulay's poems Lays of Ancient Rome.
- Alfred Tennyson's 2-volume collected Poems.

== Births ==
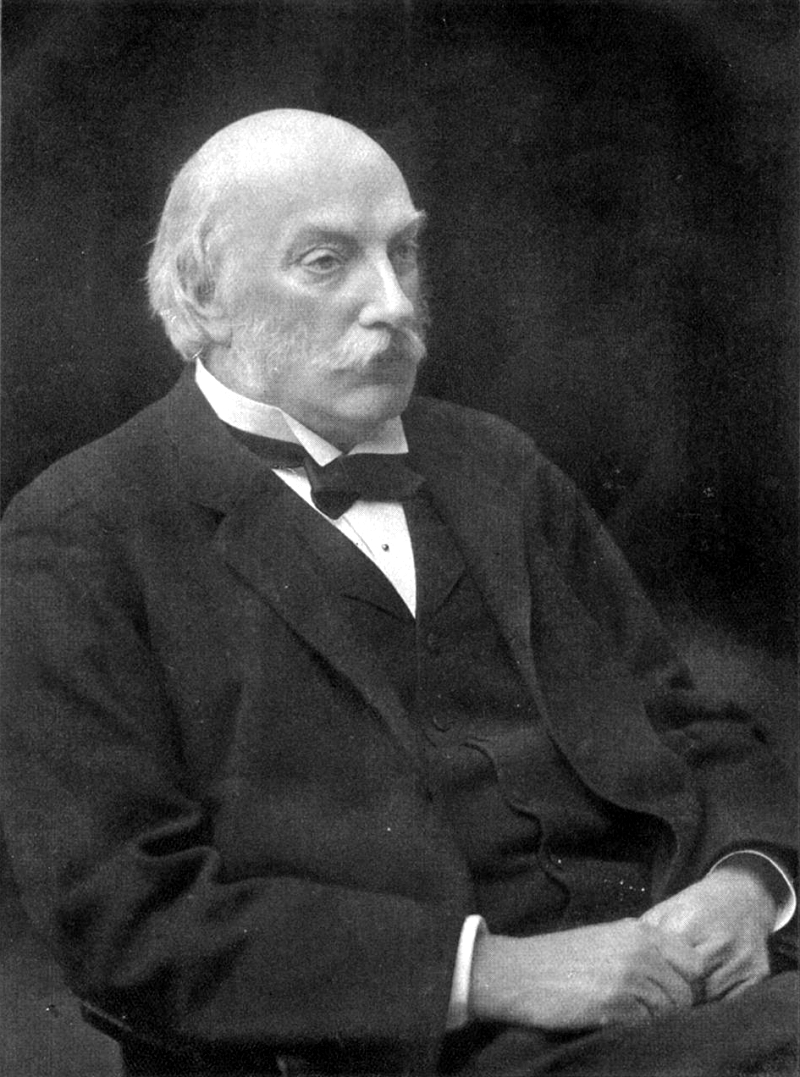
John Strutt, 3rd Baron Rayleigh

- 13 May – Arthur Sullivan, composer (died 1900)
- 26 July – Alfred Marshall, economist (died 1924)
- 23 August – Osborne Reynolds, engineer and physicist (died 1912)
- 20 September – James Dewar, chemist and physicist (died 1923)
- 12 November – John Strutt, 3rd Baron Rayleigh, physicist, Nobel Prize laureate (died 1919)
- 2 December – Charles W. Alcock, footballer and football official (died 1907)

== Deaths ==
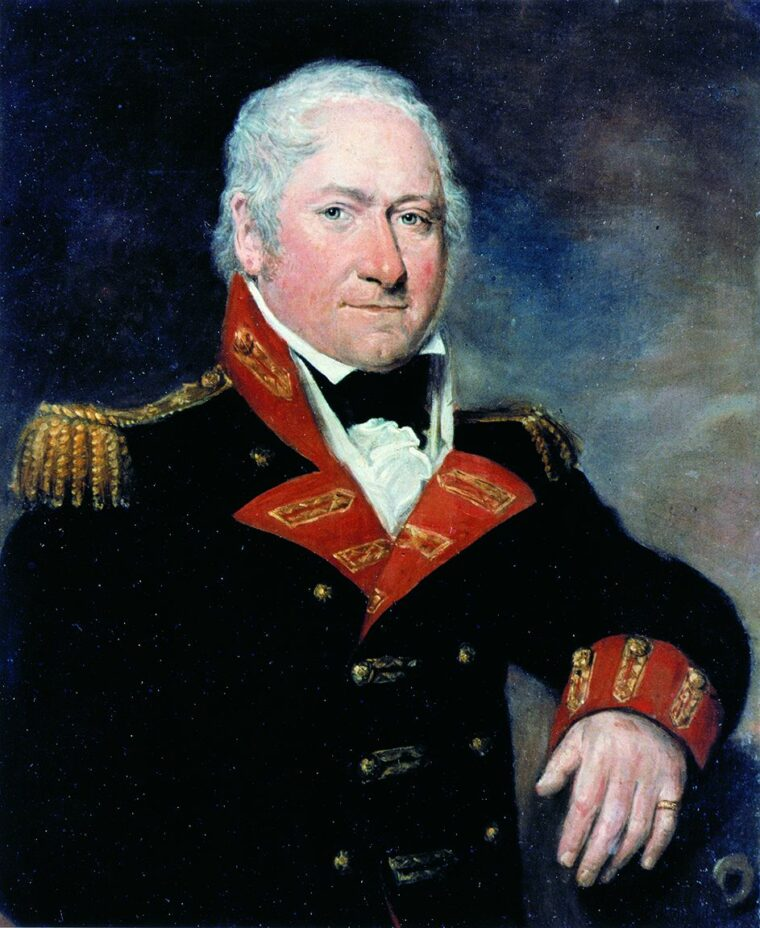
Henry Shrapnel

- 13 March – Henry Shrapnel, soldier and inventor (born 1761)
- 5 June – Thomas Henry Lister, novelist (born 1800)
- 12 June – Thomas Arnold, historian and schoolmaster (born 1795)
- 1 September – Lord Robert Somerset, general (born 1776)
- 7 October – Jonathan Backhouse, banker and Quaker minister (born 1779)
- 31 October – Solomon Hirschell, chief rabbi of the United Kingdom (born 1762)
