= Nottingham Road Cemetery =

Cemetery in Derby, England

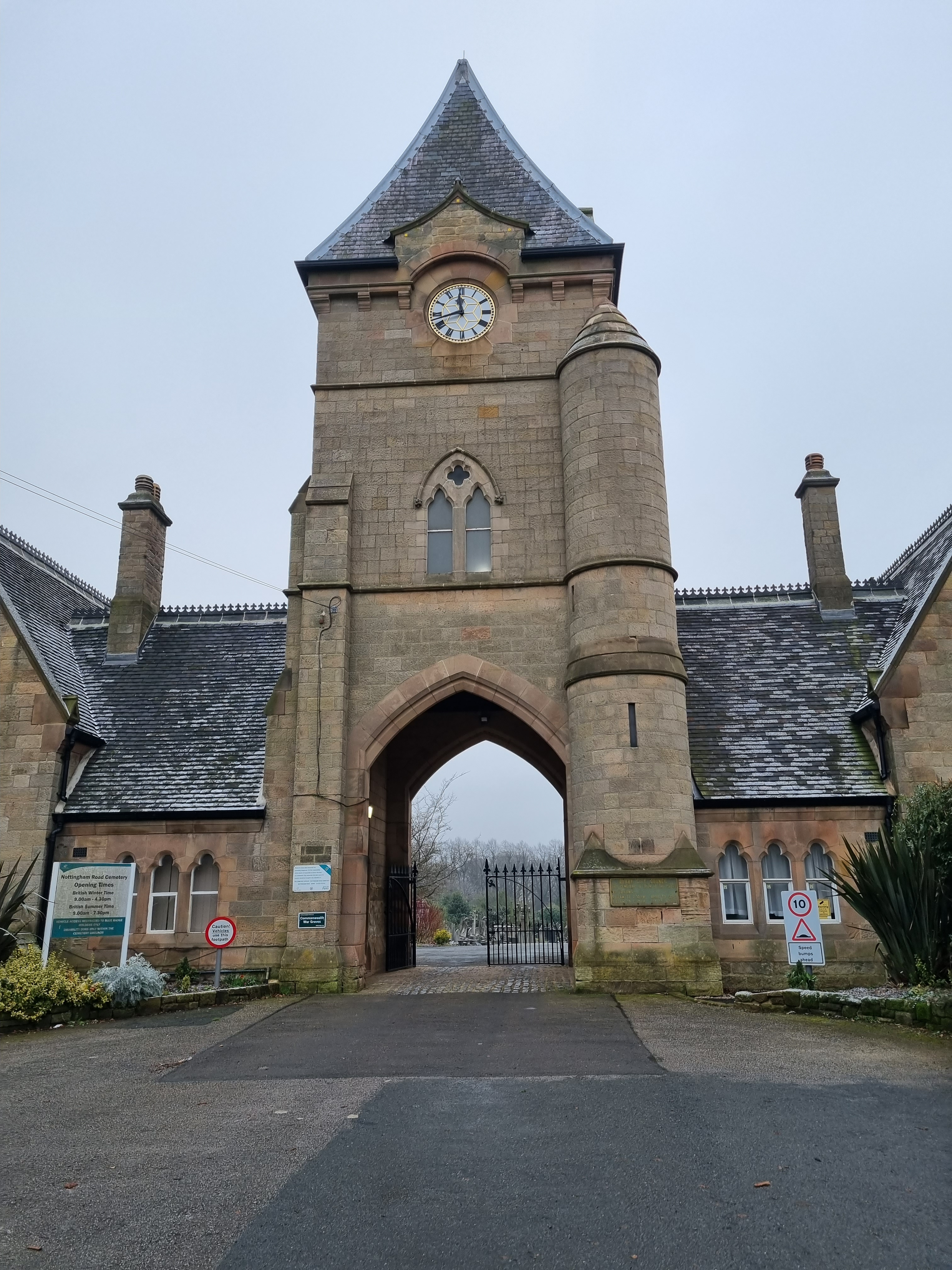
- The entrance lodge and archway over the carriage entrance
- Interactive map of Nottingham Road Cemetery

Details
- Established: May 1855
- Location: Derby
- Country: England
- Coordinates: 52°55′27″N 1°26′46″W
- Type: Active
- Owned by: Derby City Council
- Size: 21 hectares (52 acres) plus later extensions

Nottingham Road Cemetery is a municipal cemetery in Chaddesden, an inner suburb of Derby, in central England. It was established in 1855 to provide more burial capacity for the rapidly growing town.

== History ==
The Derby Burial Board was formed in 1853 to find cemetery space for the expanding population. Nottingham Road was the first municipal cemetery it created. The cemetery was originally a plot of 32 acres (13 hectares) between Nottingham Road (then the main route out of town to the east) and the Derby Canal. The grounds were laid out by James Lee of Hammersmith, London. The planting followed advice given by William Barron, the head gardener at Elvaston Castle. The ground was consecrated in April 1855 by the Bishop of Lichfield, John Lonsdale, leaving 8 acres (3.2 hectares) unconsecrated for Catholic and non-denominational burials. The cemetery opened on 1 May. Gardeners were employed to maintain the grounds, at least 11 in 1900. In 1880, the cemetery was expanded by 10 acres (4.0 hectares) in 1880, followed in 1898 by another 8 acres (3.2 hectares). Further extensions were made in 1921 and 1936.

The cemetery is still in use, owned and maintained by Derby City Council. A 21-hectare plot, mostly comprising the original cemetery and the 19th-century expansions but excluding the 20th-century sections, is listed at grade II on the Register of Historic Parks and Gardens of Special Historic Interest in England. Its historic interest is in the architecture of the buildings, by a prominent local architect, Henry Isaac Stevens, as well as the layout—the result of advice from the nationally renowned gardener William Barron—and in the extent to which the original layout survives.

The cemetery contains 342 war graves, maintained by the Commonwealth War Graves Commission, 195 from the First World War and 134 from the Second. There is a small plot of 40 graves clustered around a Cross of Sacrifice; the remainder are scattered throughout the cemetery.

== Site ==
The cemetery is located just over a mile (around 2 km) east of Derby Cathedral on undulating ground. The south-eastern boundary abuts the A52 dual carriageway, the Derby Canal having been filled in. To the west is an industrial estate, and the remaining boundaries are marked by a boundary wall running along Nottingham Road. The 20th-century extension is to the north, on the opposite of Nottingham Road. The higher parts of the grounds provide a clear view over Derby city centre to the west. The main entrance is to the north-west of the site. A recess in the boundary wall forms a driveway, which is spanned by a carriage arch, the main building in the cemetery. To the east is a maintenance entrance and to the south-east of the main entrance is a car park. The various entrances and buildings are served by a network of intersecting parallel paths. Along the main path from the carriage entrance is an avenue of mature trees.

A path connecting to the canal no longer exists but may have been used for the delivery of building materials and possibly funeral parties. The northerly parts of the cemetery are newer, rising uphill from the original plot and dating from the later 19th-century expansions. These are laid out in a grid shape marked with paths and trees.

== Buildings and structures ==
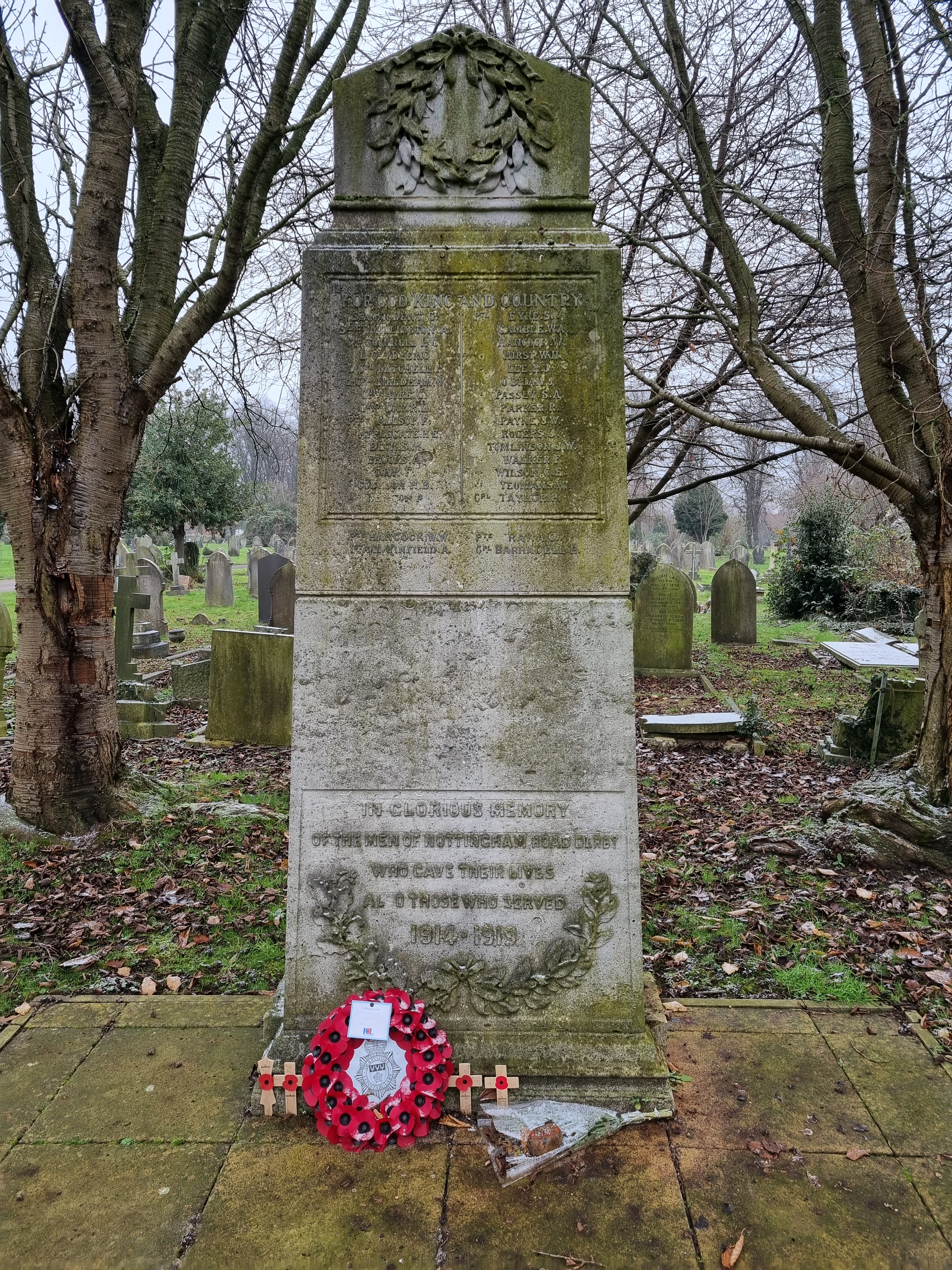
Nottingham Road War Memorial

The carriage entrance archway is in a gothic style. It consists of gatehouse with a lodge on either side, linked to a screen wall. The gatehouse has a clock tower above the arch and wrought iron gates. It is a grade II listed building.

A collection of elaborate Edwardian memorials from the inter-war period is just to the south of the arch. Several of the monuments are in white marble and include open Bibles, urns, and angels. The cemetery also contains two chapels, one Anglican and one non-conformist, though the Anglican one is no longer used for services.

Nottingham Road War Memorial, commemorating men from the local area who died in the First World War, is situated 30 metres (98 feet) from the carriage entrance. The memorial has moved several times during its life and is a grade II listed building. It was originally erected outside St Mark's Church around 1919, then moved between 1966 and 1974 to stand outside the Royal British Legion club in Chaddesden. When the club closed in the 1990s, the memorial was moved to Nottingham Road Cemetery. It is a three-stage obelisk which tapers towards a triangular head and stands at the end of its own paved area off the main promenade. It contains the names of 34 men.

== See also ==
- List of cemeteries in England
- Listed parks and gardens in the East Midlands
- Listed buildings in Derby (Derwent Ward)
