= Westbourne Road Town Gardens =

Allotments in Birmingham, England

- Interactive map of Westbourne Road Town Gardens
- Type: Allotments
- Location: Edgbaston, Birmingham
- OS grid: SP 04902 85014
- Coordinates: 52°27′47″N 1°55′45″W
- Designation: Grade II

Westbourne Road Town Gardens, or Westbourne Road Leisure Gardens, is a group of allotments in Edgbaston, Birmingham, England, created in 1844. It is listed Grade II in Historic England's Register of Parks and Gardens.

== History ==
Birmingham in the late 18th and early 19th century, like other large industrial towns, had sets of rented town gardens around the centre. in 1831, there were more than 2000 around the city, with plots divided by hedges, and having a brick or timber summerhouse.

The Westbourne Road site was originally part of Birmingham Botanical Gardens; the botanical gardens were created in 1832 from a farm on the Calthorpe estate of Baron Calthorpe. In 1844 the southern third was given up, because of excessive expenditure, and was laid out by the 3rd Baron Calthorpe as a set of gardens.

By the late 19th century, The Westbourne Road Gardens were among the few such sites that remained in Birmingham. Some plots were later lost: in the 1880s when the railway line on the southern border (opened as a single track line in 1876) became a double track line; in the inter-war period due to expansion of the Edgbaston Archery and Lawn Tennis Society; and in the 1950s to create playing fields for Edgbaston Girls' School. In the 1970s the City Council (the leaseholder) demolished the brick summerhouses on the plots.

== Description ==
The basic structure of the original gardens remains, but little of the details. The plots, divided by traditional hawthorne hedges, are in three main strips separated by access tracks. To the north is Birmingham Botanical Gardens; on the south-eastern edge there is a railway line (the Cross-City Line) and the Worcester and Birmingham Canal.

== Other listed garden allotments ==
- Bagthorpe Gardens, Nottingham
- Hill Close Gardens, Warwick
- St Ann's Allotments, Nottingham
- Stoney Road Allotments, Coventry
