= Stoney Road Allotments =

Allotments in Coventry, England

- Park Gardens
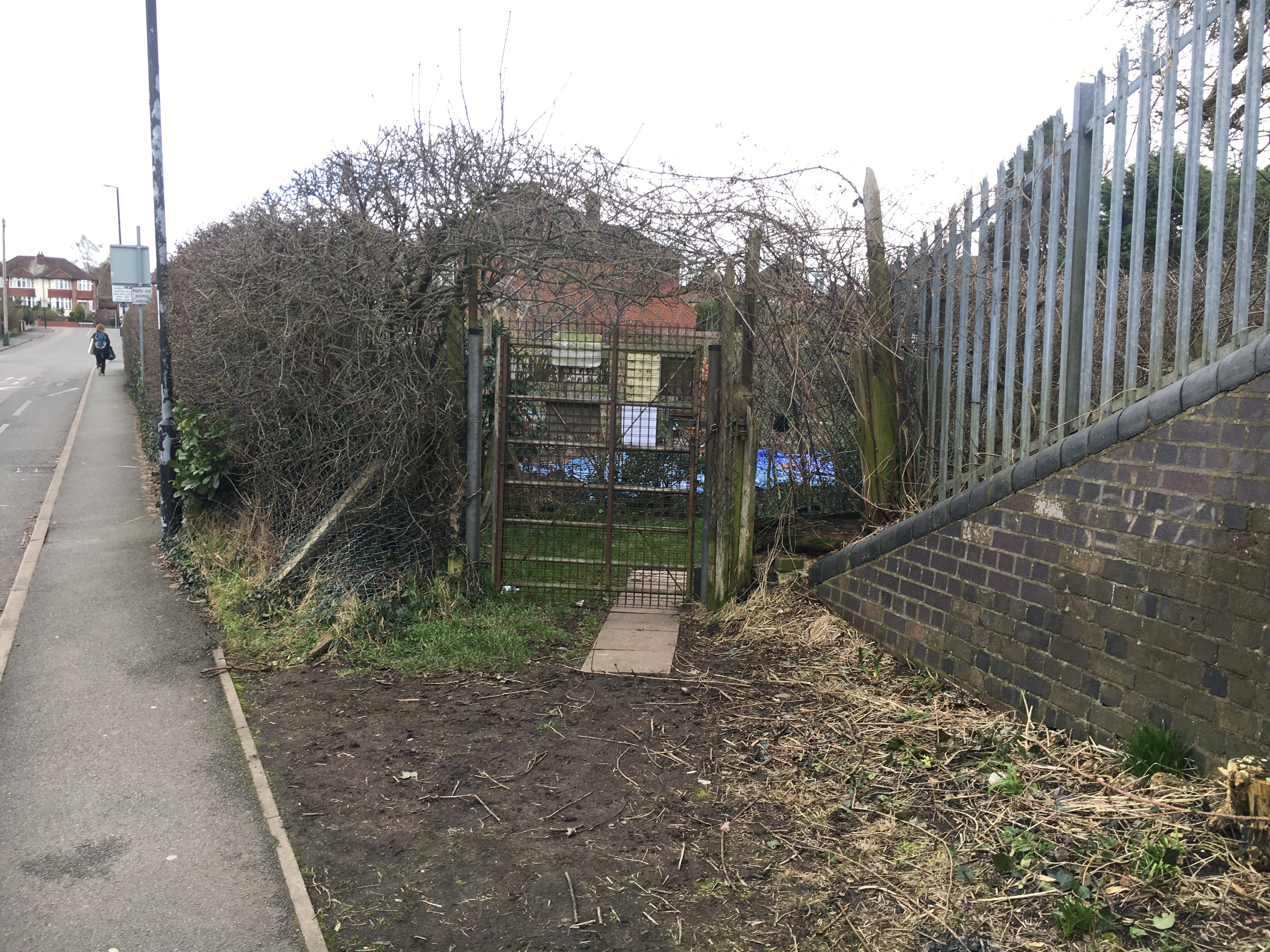
- A view of the south gate of Stoney Road Allotments
- Interactive map of Stoney Road Allotments
- Type: Allotments
- Location: Stoney Road
- Nearest city: Coventry
- Coordinates: 52.3983°N 1.5103°W
- Area: ~5ha
- Owner: Coventry City Council
- Status: Grade II* listed

Stoney Road Allotments consists of 123 council-owned allotments covering around 5 hectares just south of Coventry city centre. They were created in the mid 19th century as pleasure-gardens for the people of the city, and were Grade II* listed in 2001.

== History ==
In the late 18th and early 19th century, many people living in the growing towns rented small plots of land on the outskirts as ornamental or productive gardens. These gardens were typically between 1/8 and 1/6 of an acre, separated from the neighbouring plots by hedges. Stoney Road Allotments began life as a collection of these gardens in Cheylesmore park shortly after 1853. Various structures were built on some of the plots, including an elaborate half-timbered summer house which is still present today. In July 1935 the City Council acquired the allotments for the sum of £1100. The site was Grade II* listed on 7 March 2001 because it retains features of the original pleasure-gardens as well as period structures including summer houses and glasshouses.

== Other listed garden allotments ==
- Bagthorpe Gardens, Nottingham
- Hill Close Gardens, Warwick
- St Ann's Allotments, Nottingham
- Westbourne Road Town Gardens, Birmingham
