= Listed buildings in Chaddesden =

Chaddesden is an electoral ward in the city of Derby, England. The ward contains three listed buildings that are recorded in the National Heritage List for England. Of these, one is listed at Grade I, the highest of the three grades, and the others are at Grade II, the lowest grade. The ward is a suburb to the east of the centre of the city and is largely residential. The listed buildings consist of a church, a cottage and a war memorial.

== Key ==
Grade	Criteria
I	Buildings of exceptional interest, sometimes considered to be internationally important
II	Buildings of national importance and special interest

== Buildings ==
Name and location	Photograph	Date	Notes	Grade
St Mary's Church; 52.92814°N 1.43349°W		c. 1357	The church has been altered and extended through the centuries, it was restored in 1857–58 by G. G. Place, and in 1858–59 by G. E. Street. It is built in stone, and consists of a nave, north and south aisles, a chancel and a west tower. The tower is in Perpendicular style, and has angle buttresses, string courses, a west doorway above which is a three-light window, clock faces, two-light bell openings, and an embattled parapet.	I
117 Chaddesden Lane; 52.92865°N 1.43456°W	—	Late 18th century	A brick cottage with modillion eaves and a tile roof. There are two storeys and three bays. The doorway has a segmental head, and the windows are casements, those in the ground floor with segmental heads.	II
War memorial 52.92872°N 1.43435°W		1923	The war memorial is set into an alcove by the side of the road, and consists of a marble plaque with a sandstone surround. The plaque is rectangular, and has a stepped frame with floral sprigs at the top corners, and a laurel wreath with a crossed rifle and sword in relief at the head, under which is an inscription and the names of those lost in the First World War. Above the plaque is a cornice, and below it is a shelf. The walls of the alcove are in roughcast brick, and there are four piers with sandstone dome finials.	II
