= St Mary's Church, Chaddesden =

St Mary's Church
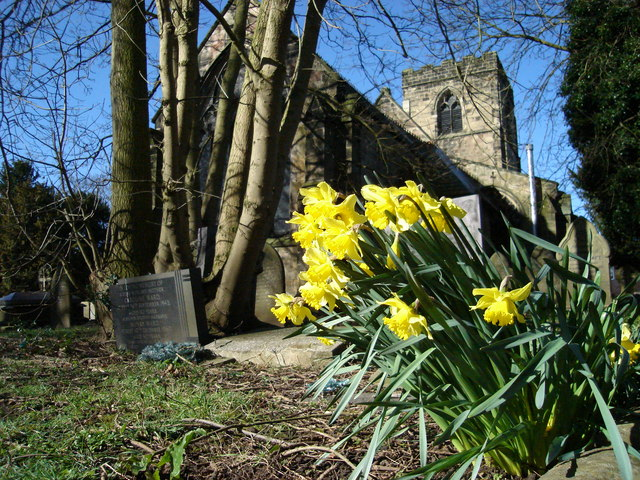
- St Mary's Church
- 52.9281°N 1.4336°W
- Location: Chaddesden, Derby, Derbyshire
- Country: England
- Denomination: Church of England
- Churchmanship: Conservative Evangelical
- Website: Church website

Architecture
- Years built: 14th century

Administration
- Diocese: Diocese of Derby
- Parish: Chaddesden

Clergy
- Vicar: The Revd Dr Jason Ward

St Mary's Church is a Church of England parish church in Chaddesden, a suburb of Derby, England. One of the oldest churches in the city, it is a Grade I listed building dating back to the mid-14th century.

== History ==
St Mary's was rebuilt by Henry Chaddesden, Archdeacon of Leicester, in approximately 1347; the chancel dates from this period. The church contains a 15th-century rood screen and an unusual chalice-shaped font which may be over 600 years old. The church has long been associated with the Wilmot family, who formerly owned much land around the then village of Chaddesden from the Mediaeval period. The monuments of several members of the family can be seen in the churchyard.

The Wilmots' seat was the now demolished Chaddesden Hall, close to the church; the former grounds of the house form the modern Chaddesden Park, adjacent to St Mary's. One member of the family, Robert Wilmot, founded the almshouses which once stood outside the church; these are now demolished, although a hump on the ground indicate their location.

The churchyard contains the war graves of a Royal Navy sailor and a General Service Corps soldier of World War II.

=== Present day ===
On 20 June 1952, the church was designated a Grade I listed building. In 2018 the church was put on Historic England's Heritage at Risk Register which described it as being in 'poor' condition due to problems with the roof. As of 2019, however, the roof of the main part of the building has been entirely replaced with Westmorland Green Slate in a £250,000 project, largely funded by Historic England among others.

St Mary's Church is within the Conservative Evangelical tradition of the Church of England. It receives alternative episcopal oversight from the Bishop of Ebbsfleet.

== Organ ==
The church pipe organ was built by Isaac Abbott of Leeds in 1876. The organ was erected to the memory of the parents of Sir Henry Wilmot, 5th Baronet and the opening recital was given on 28 September 1876. A specification of the organ as recorded in 1996 can be found on the National Pipe Organ Register.

== The bells ==
The peal of three bells dates from ca. 1499 (Mellours), 1652 (George Oldfield) and 1742 (Thomas Hedderly), and is currently unringable. However, a local community group was set up in 2023 to raise the funds necessary to get the bells back to full swing, and the project is expected to be completed in 2025/2026.

== See also ==
- Grade I listed churches in Derbyshire
- Grade I listed buildings in Derbyshire
- Listed buildings in Chaddesden
