= Listed buildings in Derby (Derwent Ward) =

Derwent is an electoral ward in the city of Derby, England. The ward contains four listed buildings that are recorded in the National Heritage List for England. All the listed buildings are designated at Grade II, the lowest of the three grades, which is applied to "buildings of national importance and special interest". The ward is to the northeast of the centre of the city, and the listed buildings consist of a bridge, buildings at the entrance to Nottingham Road Cemetery, a war memorial in thea cemetery, and an office block.

== Buildings ==
Name and location	Photograph	Date	Notes
Alfreton Road Bridge; 52.94669°N 1.46335°W	—	1836–40	The bridge was built by the North Midland Railway to carry Alfreton Road over its line. It is in sandstone with gritstone dressings, and soffits in red brick. The bridge consists of three segmental arches, the middle arch the largest. The arches have rusticated voussoirs springing from impost bands. The parapets are coped, and the bridge is framed by piers with a concave rake and rusticated quoins.
Gatehouse and lodges, Nottingham Road Cemetery; 52.92632°N 1.44724°W		1854–55	The gatehouse and lodges were designed by H. I. Stevens, and are in stone. In the centre is the gatehouse, consisting of a tower above an archway, flanked by links to gabled side wings. The tower has three stages, angle buttresses, a bartizan on the right, a clock face in the top stage, corbelled eaves, and a pyramidal slate roof. The wings contain two-light mullioned windows with cusped heads and hood moulds. The lodges are separate, and have a single storey, a cruciform plan, and a tile roof. They contain three-light mullioned windows with pointed heads and hood moulds.
War memorial 52.92574°N 1.44646°W		c. 1919	The war memorial, which was moved to its present site in Nottingham Road Cemetery in the 1990s, is in Hopton Wood stone. It consists of a three-stage obelisk, rectangular at the base and tapering to become triangular at the top. In the bottom stage is an inscription and a festoon, and the top stage contains an inscription and the names of those lost in the First World War.
Office block, former Aitons Works; 52.92957°N 1.46643°W		1931	The office block was designed by Norah Aiton and Betty Scott. It has a steel frame, the exterior in blue engineering brick and rendered cladding, and has glazed saw-tooth north-light roofs. There are two storeys, and the street front is in two sections, with three windows to the left and ten to the right. The left part contains a doorway that has a cantilevered hood on tubular steel brackets and side lights. Above a brick wall are continuous windows, over which is rendering and a parapet.
