= Hill Close Gardens, Warwick =

Gardens in Warwick, England

Coordinates: 52°16′51″N 1°35′38″W

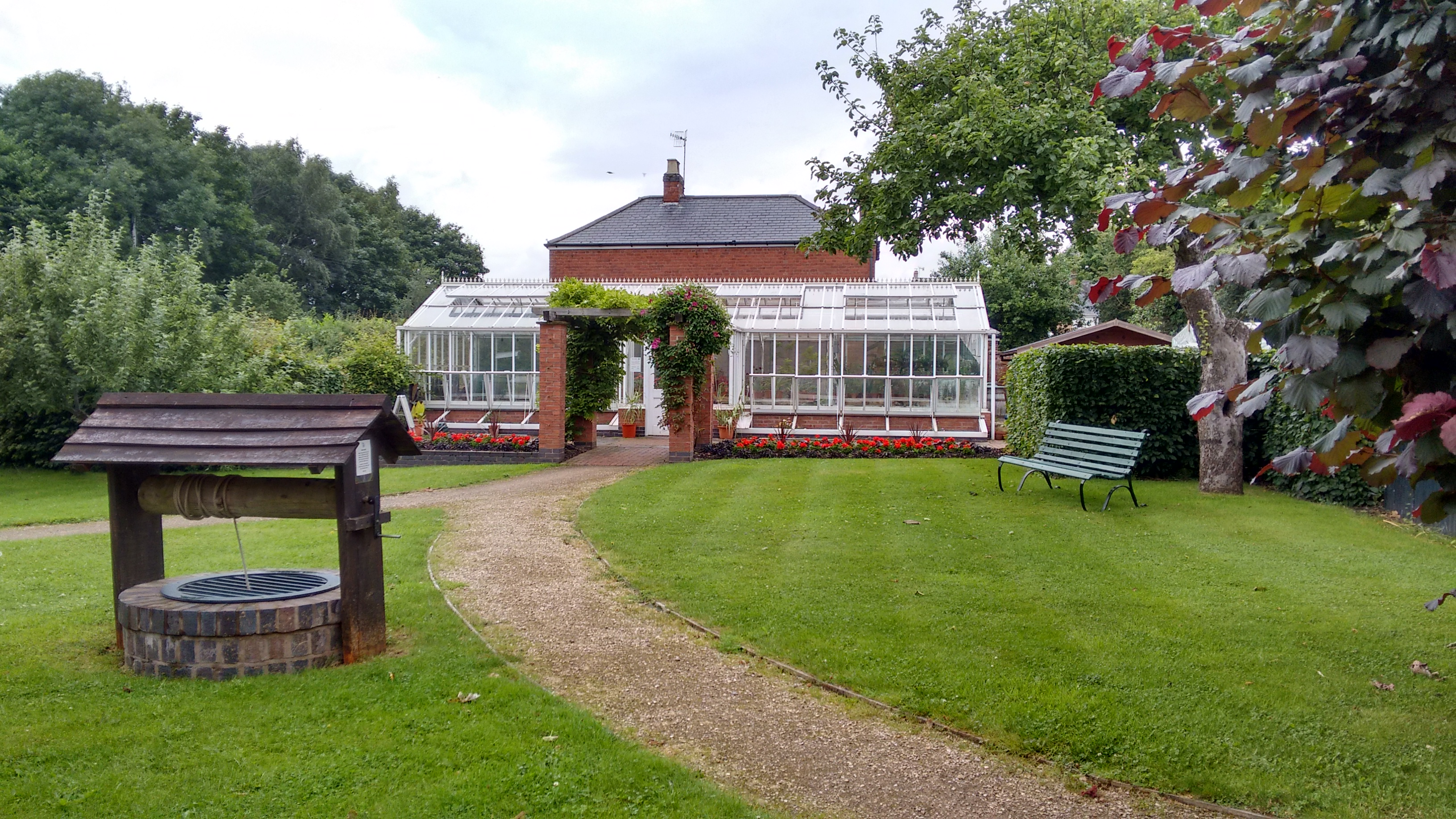
Well and greenhouse at Hill Close Gardens.

Hill Close Gardens is a group of 18 surviving Victorian detached gardens on a hillside in Warwick, Warwickshire, England. It is listed Grade II* in Historic England's Register of Parks and Gardens.

== History ==
The gardens were set up in the 19th century on a hillside overlooking Warwick Racecourse to provide gardens for owners of townhouses which did not have their own gardens. They were generally owned staying in families for generations, although some were rented. Each was enclosed by either a wall or hedge, complete with lockable gate to ensure privacy. Many of them had summer houses built so that families could spend the entire day in the garden, whatever the weather. They fell into disuse in the 20th century, with only one or two remaining in use after World War II.

In the 1950s the local council (Warwick Municipal Borough) started buying up the plots with a plan to re-develop the hillside and in the 1960s it was designated for social housing. Planning permission was granted in the 1980s and then subsequently lapsed, although some building was completed.

In 1994, four of the summer houses were 'listed' as being of historical interest, and in 2000 a Trust was formed to restore the gardens to their Victorian status.

The gardens opened to the public at Easter 2007 and have been operated by the Trust since then.

=== Timeline ===
- 1500 onwards: enclosure of St Mary's Common, grazing rights retained for commoners, on aftermath, after Lammas (1 August)
- 1707 Racing begins
- 1725 Bread & Beef Close endowed for charity by Nicholas Rothwell. (Note: Shown as "Bread and Meat Close" on Google Maps, 2026.)
- 1780 The Bowling Green probably developed/improved
- Late 1700s Pasture, probably owned by William Wilson, a Warwickshire landowner
- 1806 Land shows as undeveloped on Warwick Castle Estate map
- 1820 – 1850 Other detached gardens existed in Warwick
- 1841 Wilson Estate partitioned, owner becomes Swain Wilson of Coundon
- 1845 Heir Edward Wilson divides the land up into gardens
- 1851 Map shows 23 plots, some with buildings, maybe wooden, or brick
- 1857 Bread & Beef Close divided into gardens
- ca. 1860 Stream culverted
- 1866 Sold to Mark Philips of Welcombe - 32 plots for £1750, let for total of £77 (4.5%)
- 1877 By now, all but 6 sold. Division of the freehold hinders subsequent building development.
- 1886 Map shows summer houses on plots 5,16,17,19, 25 (22 is added later)
- 1910 Building of street St Pauls Close & Terrace and Linen Street
- 1948 Commons pass to Local Authority
- 1950's Warwick Racecourse stables built
- 1950's Warwick Municipal Borough start buying plots (while planning for an inner ring road)
- 1960's Designated for social housing
- 1985 Warwick District Council (WDC) first apply to build on Hill Close
- 1989 Planning Permission for building lapsed – approx. 19 plots then remaining
- 1993 LADRA & Warwick Gardens Trust started objecting
- 1994 Listing of 4 summerhouses, and later the gardens registered
- 1998 Clearance work begun on site by volunteers
- 2000 Hill Close Gardens Trust set up, leasing land from WDC for a peppercorn rent
- 2005 National Lottery Heritage Fund grant obtained, restoration starts
- Easter 2007 Gardens opened to the public

== Other listed garden allotments ==
- Bagthorpe Gardens, Nottingham
- St Ann's Allotments, Nottingham
- Stoney Road Allotments, Coventry
- Westbourne Road Town Gardens, Birmingham
