= Lincoln Arboretum =

Arboretum in Lincoln, England

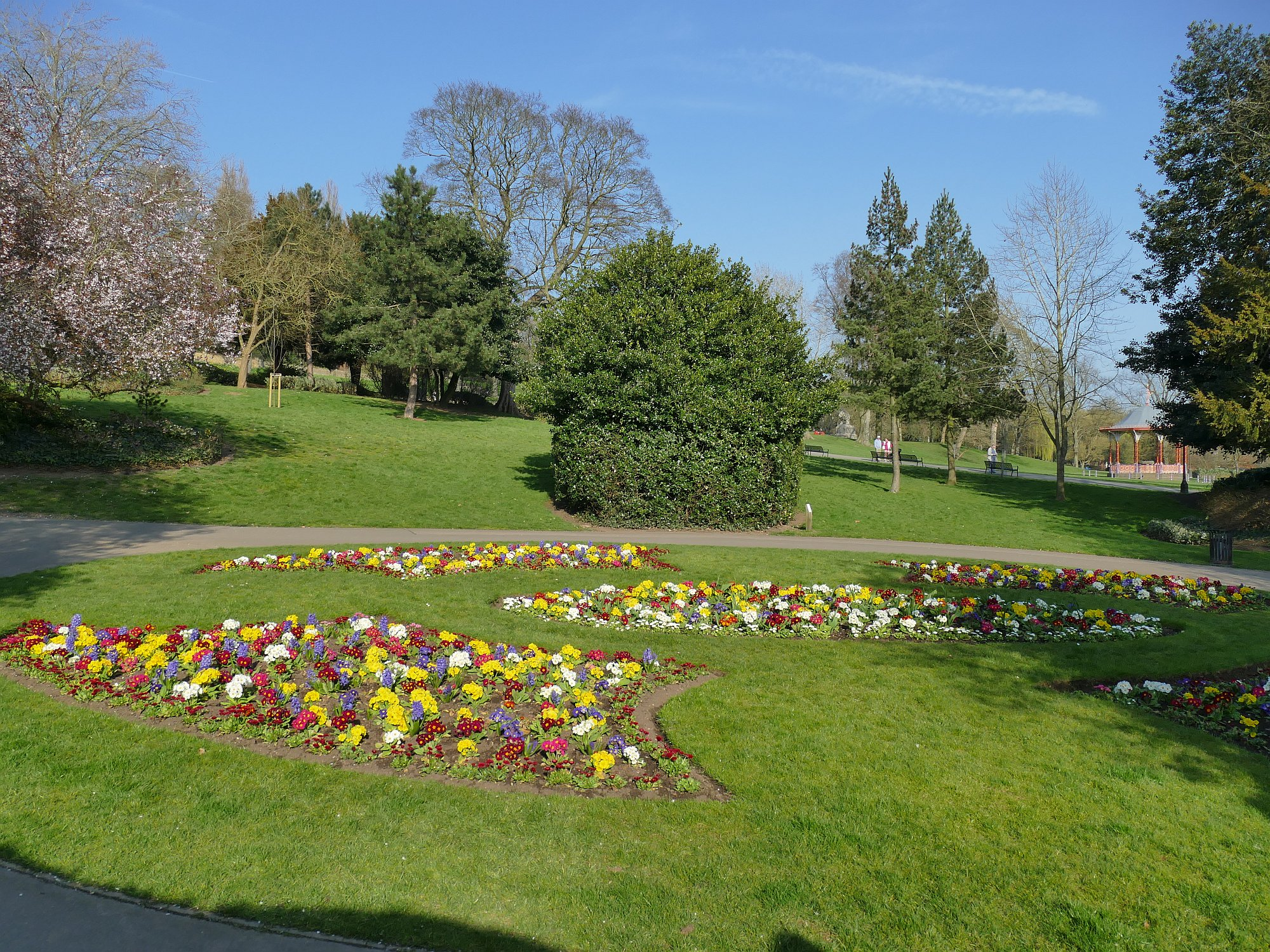
- A view of the Arboretum

- Location within Lincolnshire
- Type: Arboretum
- Nearest city: Lincoln
- Coordinates: 53°13′55″N 0°31′34″W
- Area: 22 acres (8.9 ha)
- Created: 1870-1872
- Operator: City of Lincoln Council
- Designation: Grade II

The Lincoln Arboretum is a 22 acres (8.8 ha) park in Lincoln, Lincolnshire, England. The park has two ponds and varied tree cover, and was designed and laid out between 1870 and 1872 by the celebrated Victorian gardener Edward Milner. The arboretum is a park of Grade II importance.

== History ==
Following the national trend of providing public parks, and with the closure of the nearby Temple Gardens, which had operated on a semi-public basis, the Lincoln Commons Act (1870) was passed. Monks Leys Common, located to the east of the city, was purchased by the Corporation through Act of Parliament. Authorisation was also given to sell 3 acres (1.2 ha) of the land for residential building purposes to help fund the layout and construction of the Arboretum, which would become Lincoln's first truly public park.

The Arboretum has a lodge at its west entrance on Monks Road, and has three terraces of housing adjoining it to its western edge: Arboretum View, Monks Leys Terrace, and Woodland View.

== Renovation of the Arboretum in 2002–2003 ==
The Arboretum reopened on 19 September 2003, following £3 million worth of restoration work to bring it back to its original state. Works have included: overhauling and improving the facilities at Abbey Lodge to provide a community access centre and visitor tea rooms, restoration of the Victorian bandstand, new period railings, restoration of a cast iron folly, new asphalt footpaths, refurbished gardens and extensive replanting, the introduction of a new children's maze, resurfacing of the major terrace feature, refurbishment of the ponds and bridges, underpinning and replacement of the stone steps, new lighting columns, installation of closed-circuit television (CCTV), refurbishment of the children play area, restoration of the lion statue and restoration of the two fountain features.

== Listed monuments ==
As well as the whole park being listed, Five of the features in the park are graded as Grade II Listed buildings:

- The bandstand. A cast Iron structure of 1884.
- The telephone kiosk. A type K6 designed by Sir Giles Gilbert Scott.
- The Shelter. A Late C19 Cast-iron sheet metal structure made by Lockerbie & Wilson of Birmingham.
- The Lion statue. Made larger than life size in 1872 by Austin & Seeley
- The Cafe. Gate lodge and refreshment room. 1872. Probably designed by Edward Milner

== Gallery ==
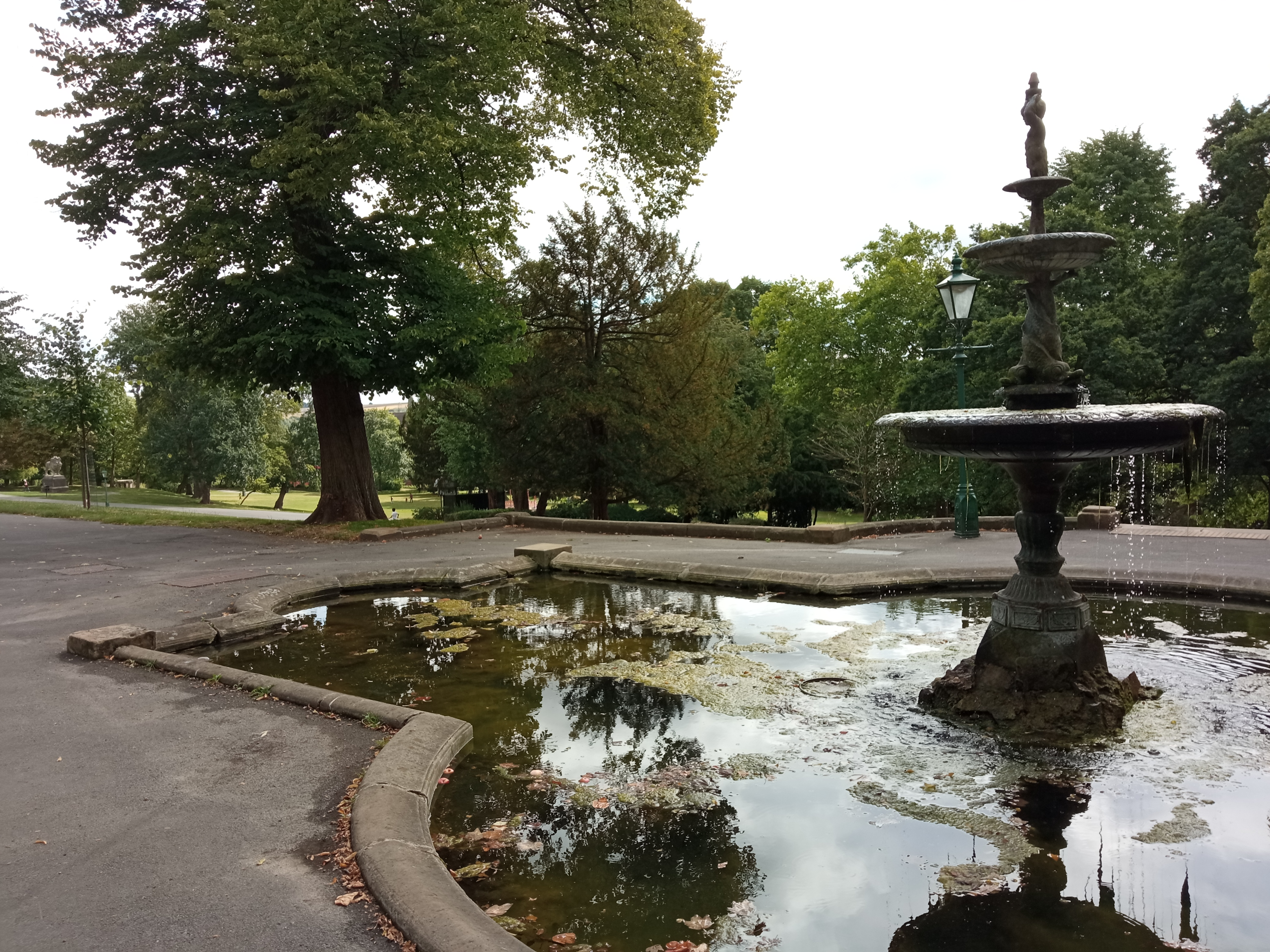
Fountain feature and pool.

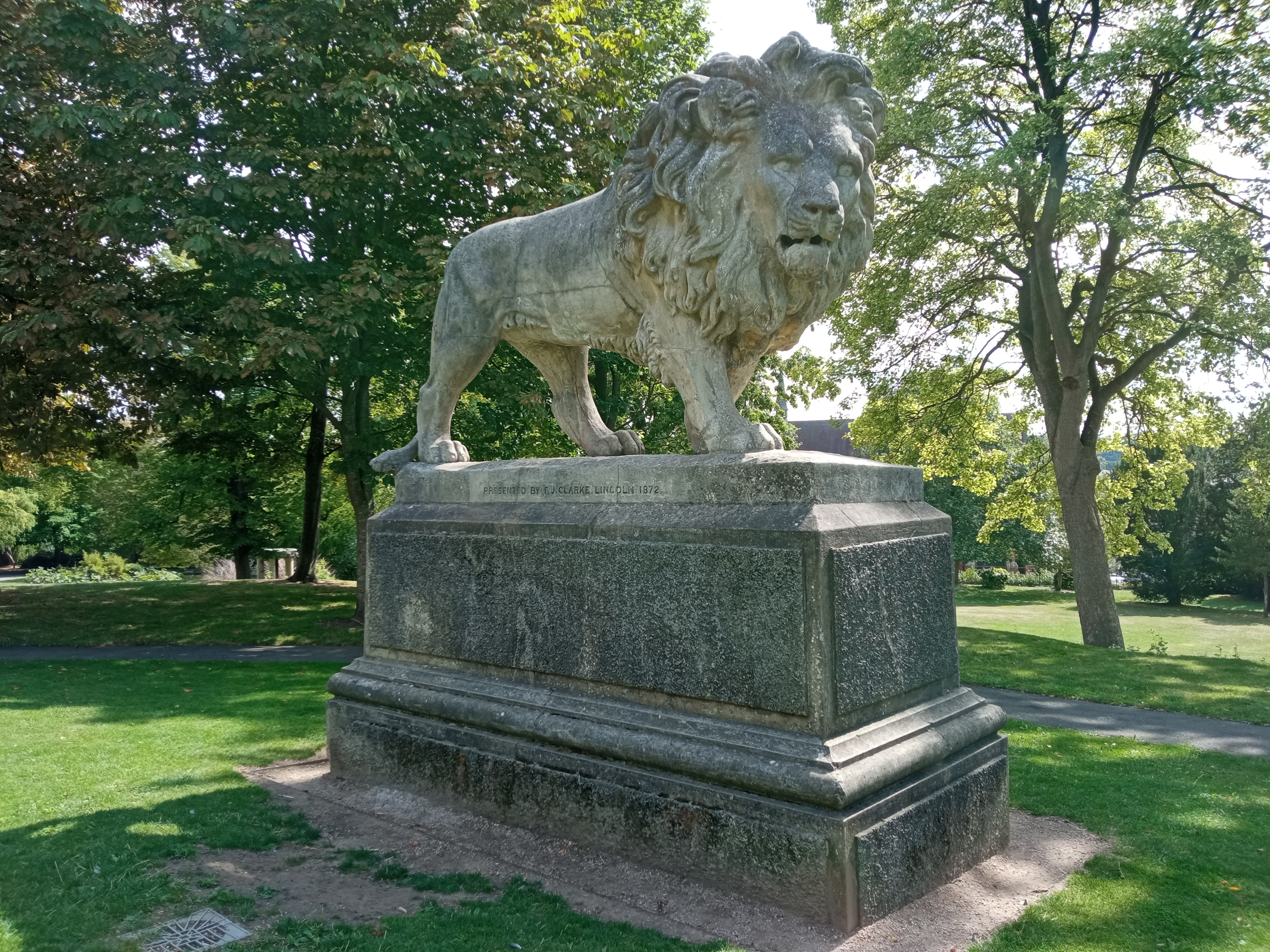
Statue of lion.

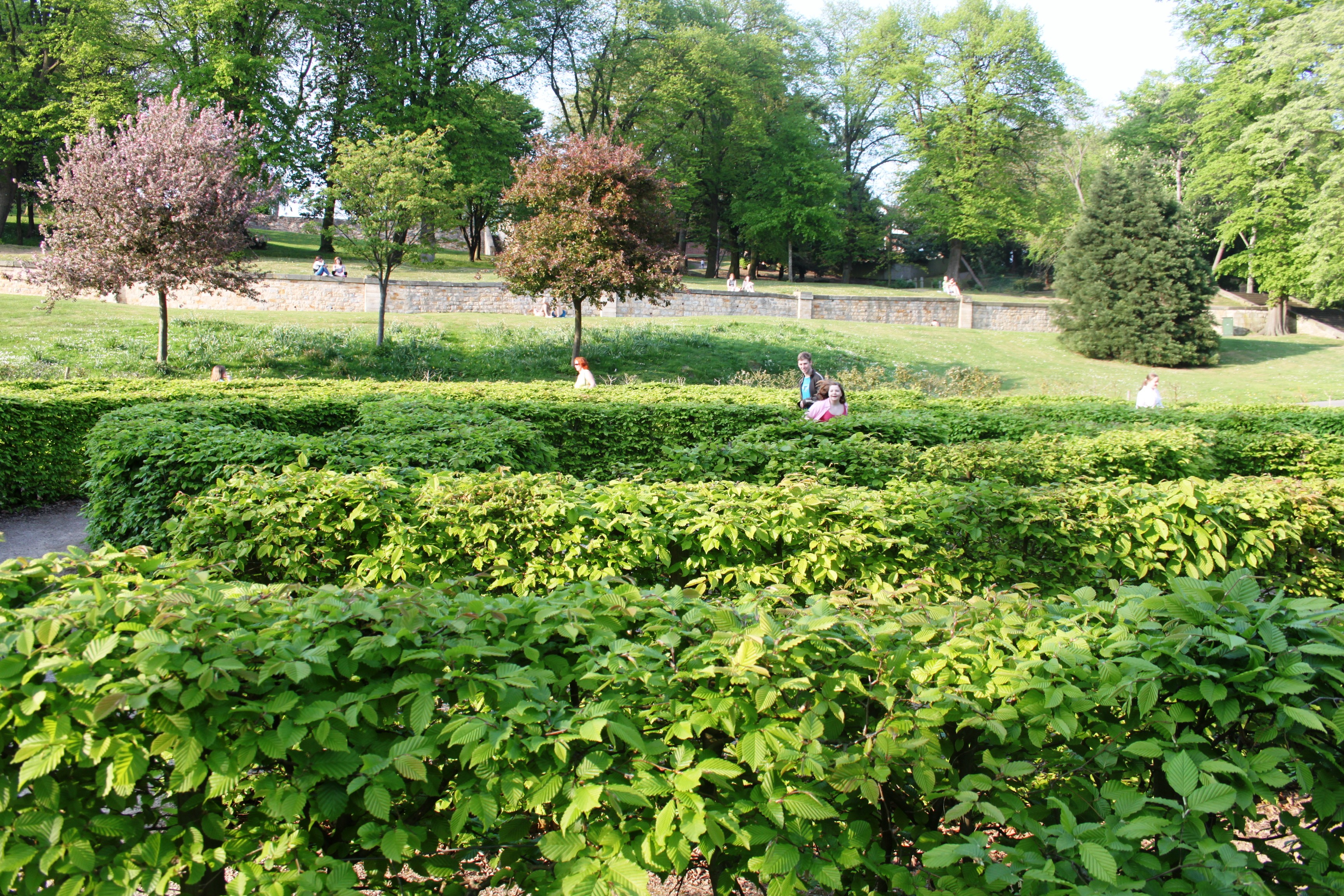
The hedge maze.

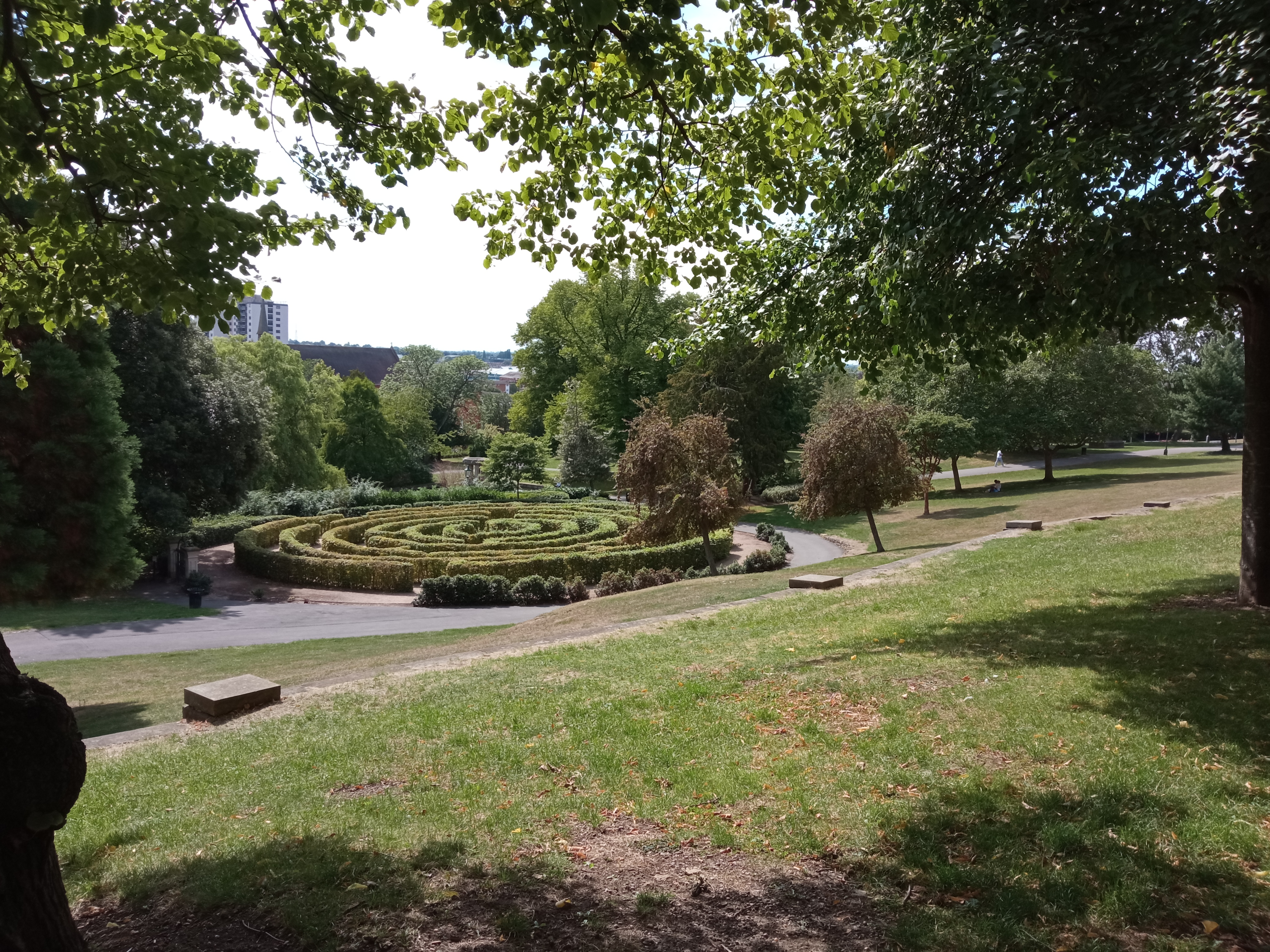
Hedge maze from slight elevation.

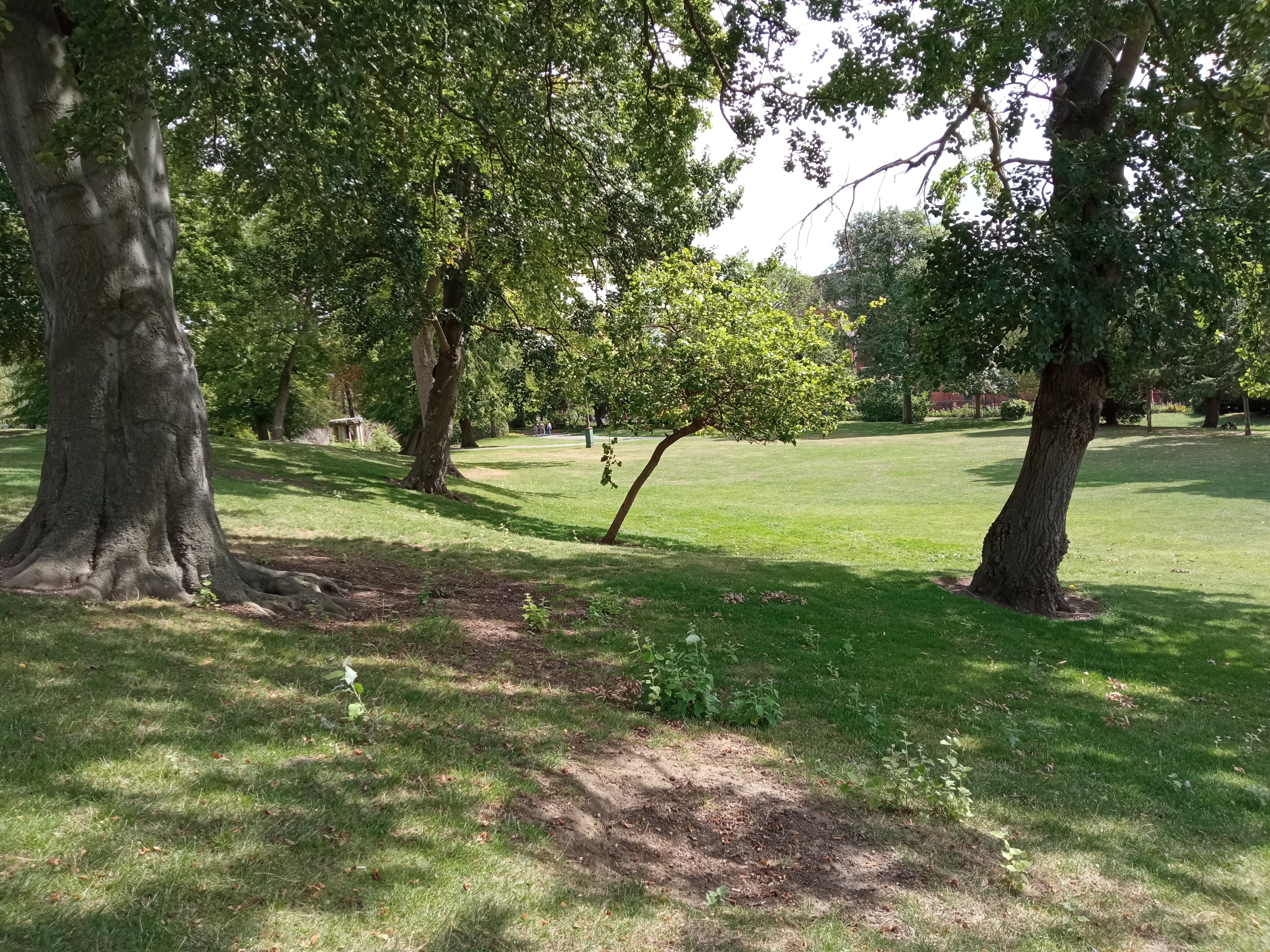
Lincoln arboretum.

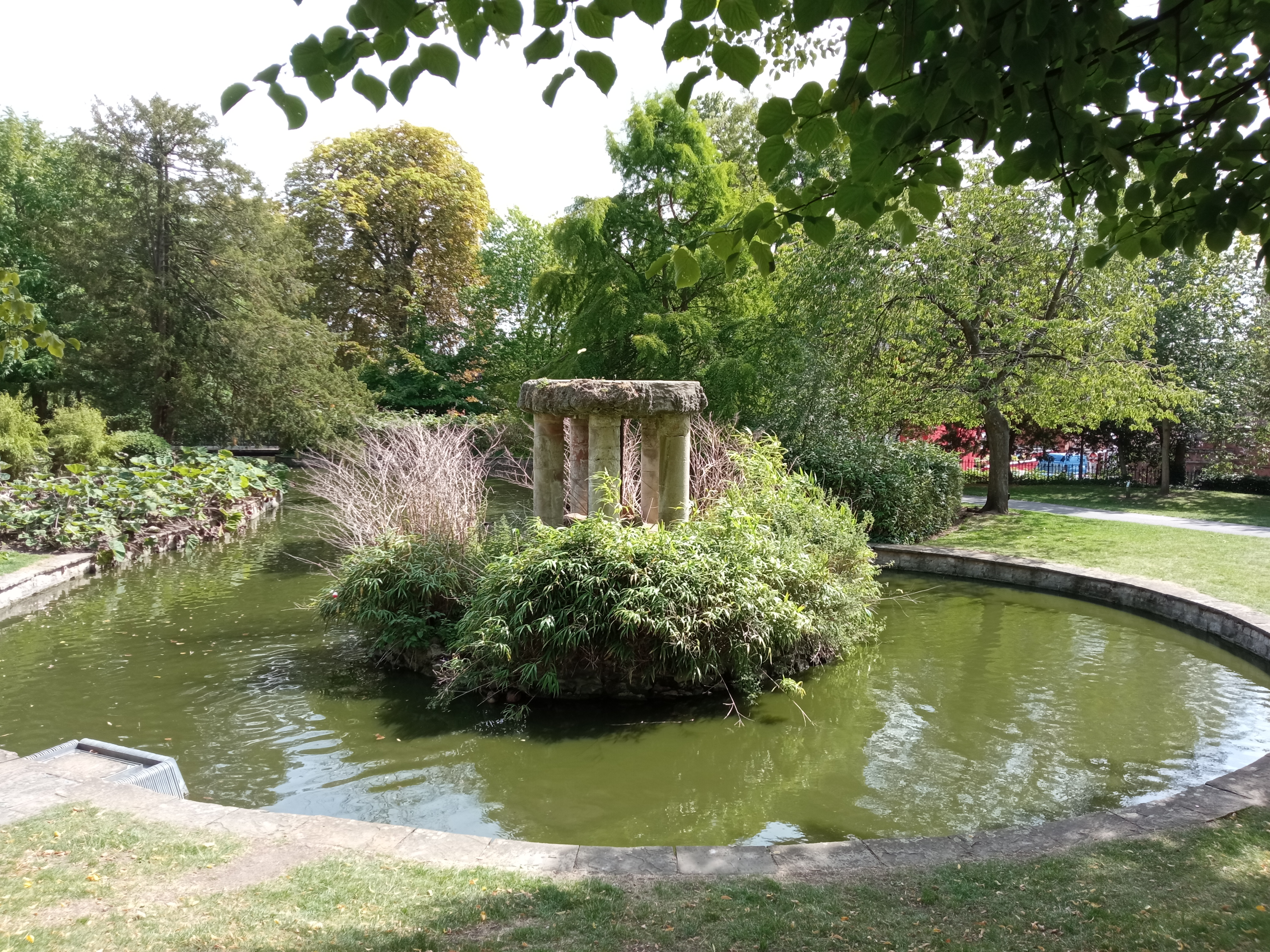
Pond in the arboretum.

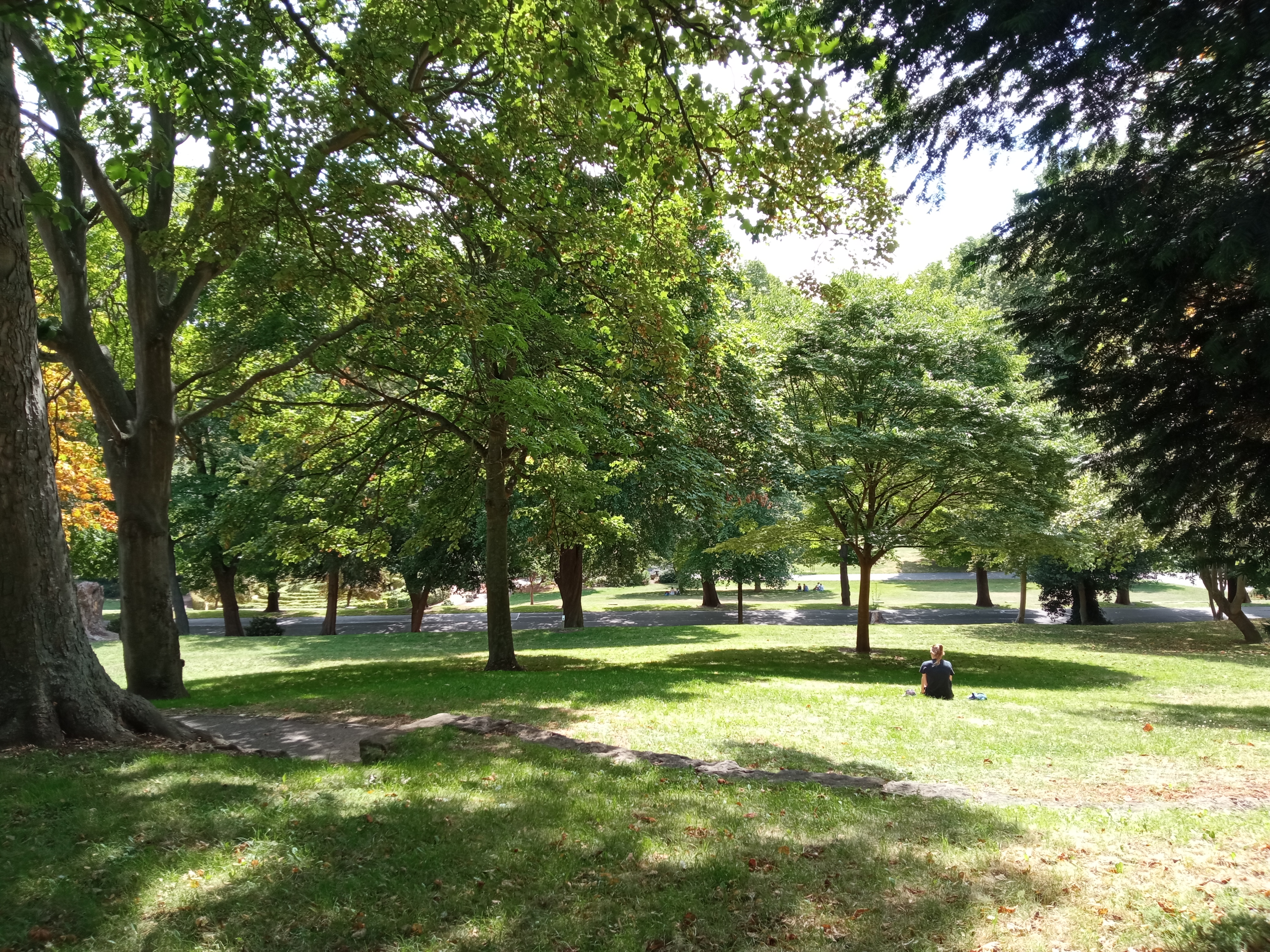
Enjoying a calm moment in the arboretum.

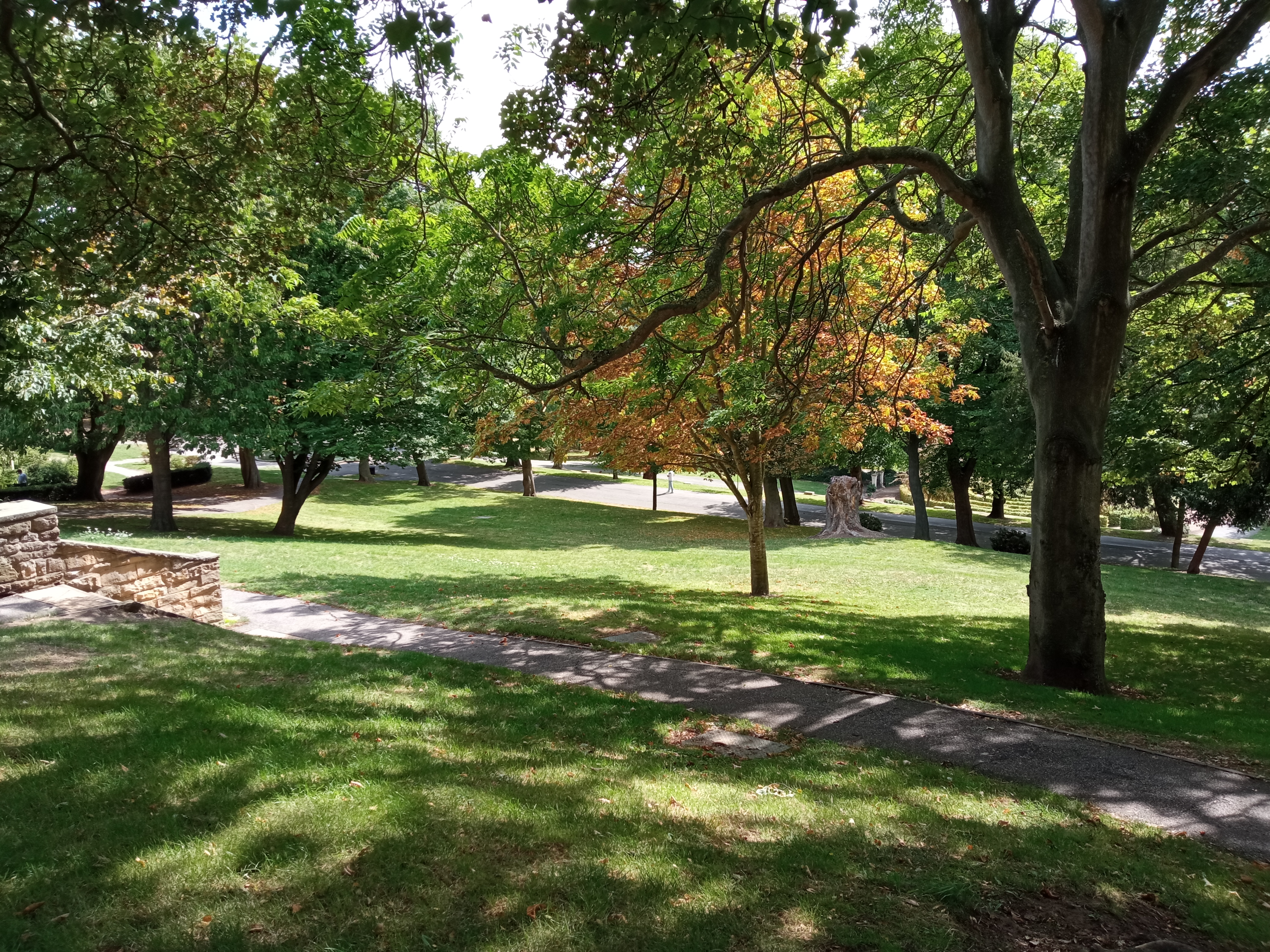
Pathway through the arboretum.

== See also ==
There are two other grade II parks in Lincoln:

- Hartsholme Country Park
- Boultham Park
