= Edward Milner =

English landscape architect

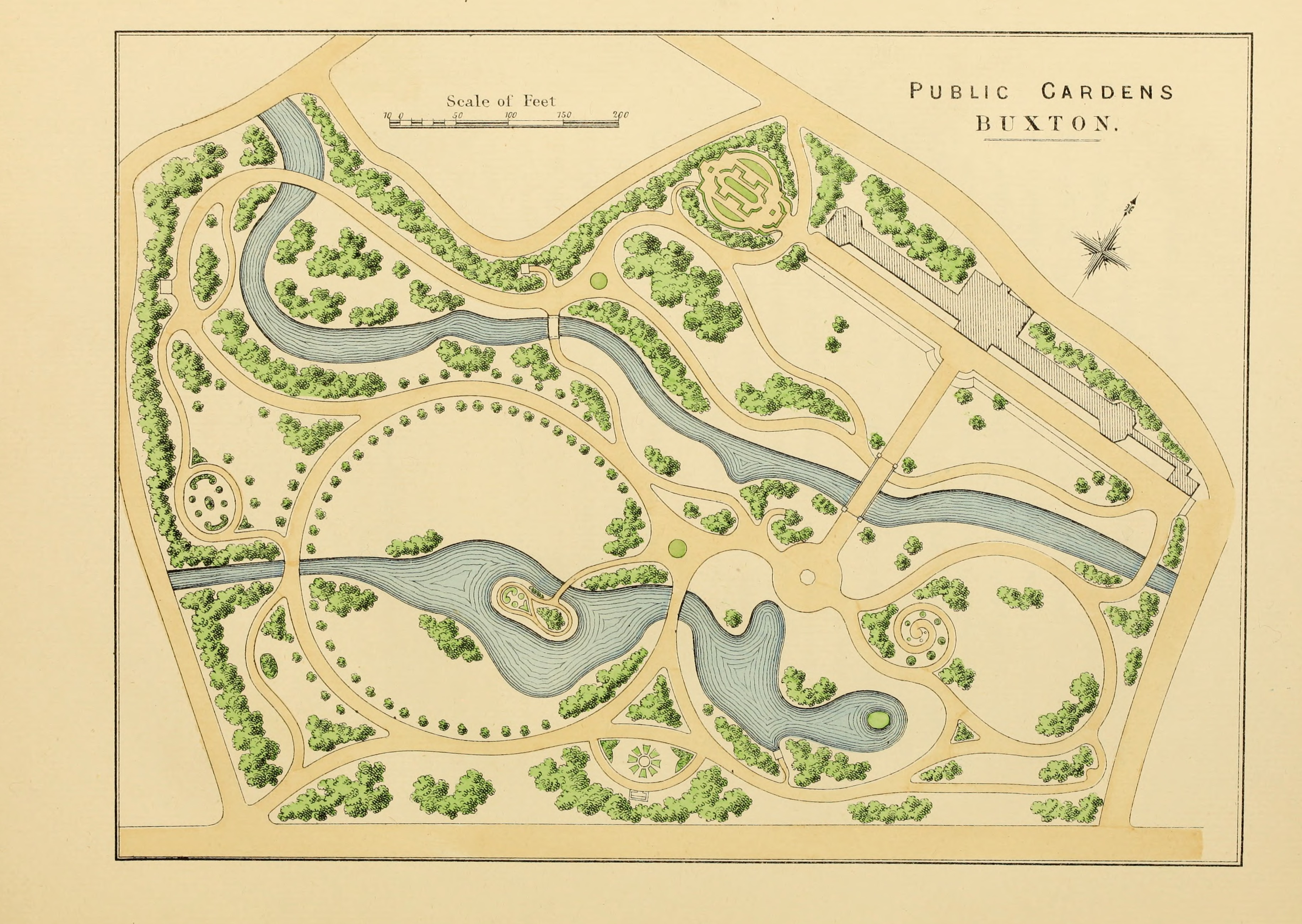
Milner's design for Buxton Pavilion Gardens

Edward Milner FLS (20 January 1819 – 26 March 1884) was an English landscape architect.

== Early life and career ==
Edward Milner was born in Darley, Derbyshire, the eldest child of Henry Milner and Mary née Scales. Henry Milner was employed at Chatsworth by William Cavendish, 6th Duke of Devonshire, as a gardener and porter. Edward was educated at Bakewell Grammar School and was then apprenticed to Chatsworth's head gardener, Joseph Paxton. In 1841 he continued his studies in Paris at the Jardin des Plantes and returned home to become Paxton's assistant. He worked with Paxton in developing and managing Princes Park, Liverpool and assisted him at Osmaston Manor in Derbyshire. In 1847 he laid out the Italian Garden at Tatton Park, Cheshire, which had been designed by Paxton. When Paxton re-erected The Crystal Palace in Penge Park, Sydenham in 1852, Milner was appointed as the superintendent of works. He also worked for Paxton in creating the People's Park, Halifax for Francis Crossley.

== Independent career ==
From the mid-1850s, Milner worked as an independent landscape gardener. He received commissions for work in England and Wales, including designing three public parks in Preston, Lancashire. These parks were constructed as part of a scheme for relieving unemployment caused by the cotton famine in the 1860s. He also designed gardens in Germany and Denmark. In 1881 he became principal of the Crystal Palace School of Gardening, established by the Crystal Palace Company.

=== Works as an independent designer ===
This is an incomplete list.

Location	House/Garden	Details	Date	Refs			
Llanfairfechan, Conwy	Bryn y Neuadd Hospital						
nr Lincoln, Lincolnshire	Hartsholme Hall	For Joseph Shuttleworth, inventor	1862				
Heighington, Lincolnshire	Heighington Hall	For Alfred Shuttleworth, industrialist			nr Matlock, Derbyshire	Stancliffe Hall	For Sir Joseph Whitworth, inventor
Tal-y-Cafn, Conwy	Bodnant Garden (original garden)	For H. D. Pochin, Chemist					
Berriew, Powys	Glansevern Hall & Gardens (original walled garden)	For Arthur Davies Owen, 1880					
nr Burton upon Trent, Staffordshire	Rangemore Hall	For M. T. Bass, brewer and philanthropist					
nr Shaftesbury, Dorset	Iwerne Minster	For G. G. Glyn, Lord Wolverton, Whip and politician					
Birmingham, West Midlands	Highbury	For Joseph Chamberlain, statesman					
Bath	Locksbrook Cemetery						
Dingestow, Monmouthshire	Dingestow Court	For Samuel Bosanquet					
Peterborough, Cambridgeshire	Elton Hall						
Halifax, West Yorkshire	Stoney Royd Cemetery		Opened 1861				
Halifax, West Yorkshire	People's Park, Halifax						
Horsham, West Sussex	Warnham Court	For Sir J. H. Pelly's son, Sir John Pelly (2nd Bt.)	1864				
Preston, Lancashire	Moor Park		Opened 1867				
Preston, Lancashire	Miller Park		Opened 1867				
Preston, Lancashire	Avenham Park		Opened 1867				
Buxton, Derbyshire	Pavilion Gardens	For the Buxton Improvements Company on behalf of the 7th Duke of Devonshire	1871				
Lincoln, Lincolnshire	Lincoln Arboretum		Opened 1872				
Bromyard, Herefordshire	Bredenbury Court		c. 1876				
Halifax, West Yorkshire	Shroggs Park	For Colonel Edward Akroyd	Opened 1881				
Morpeth, Northumberland	Wallington Hall	A parterre	1882				
Westphalia, Germany	Wildpark Dülmen	For the House of Croÿ					
Westphalia, Germany	Schloss Anholt, Borken	For the mediatised Prince of Salm-Salm					
Denmark	Knutenborg Park	For Count E. C. Knuth					
Belgium	Château Miranda	For the Liedekerke-Beaufort family	1866				

== Personal life ==
In 1844 he married Elizabeth Mary Kelly of Liverpool with whom he had 11 children. The family moved to Norwood, London, and later to Dulwich Wood Park. Milner appointed his son Henry Ernest as his principal assistant. Edward Milner founded the garden design and landscape architecture firm of Milner-White. He died at his home in 1884 leaving an estate valued at slightly over £8,000 (£1.05 million today).
