= Chaddesden =

Suburb of Derby, Derbyshire, England

Coordinates: 52.93011°N 1.438344°W

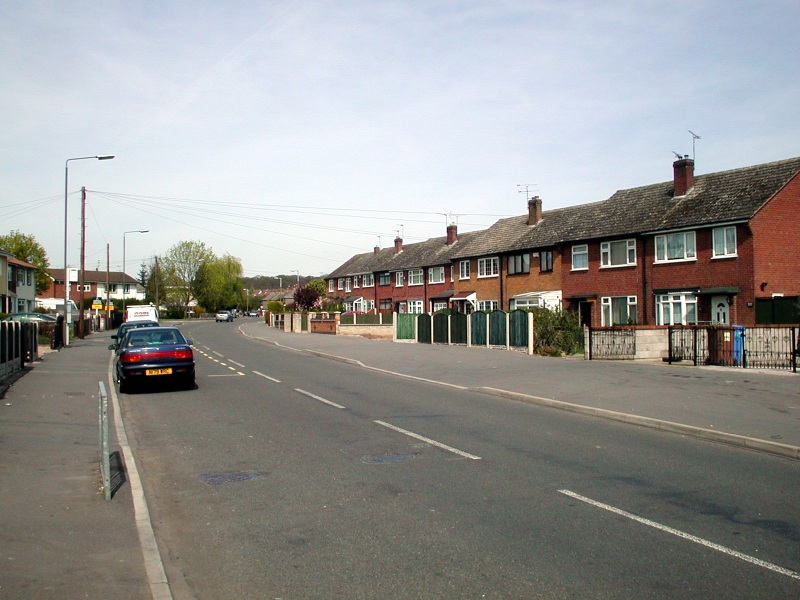
- Wood Road, April 2007

- Location within Derbyshire
- Population: 13,413
- OS grid reference: SK377371
- Unitary authority: Derby
- Ceremonial county: Derbyshire
- Region: East Midlands
- Country: England
- Sovereign state: United Kingdom
- Post town: DERBY
- Postcode district: DE21
- Dialling code: 01332
- Police: Derbyshire
- Fire: Derbyshire
- Ambulance: East Midlands
- UK Parliament: Derby North

Chaddesden, also known locally as Chadd, is a large residential suburb of Derby, in the ceremonial county of Derbyshire, England. Historically a separate village centred on Chaddesden Hall and the 14th-century St Mary's Church, the area was significantly expanded by 20th-century housing developments, and became part of the then County Borough of Derby in 1968, prior to Derby's city status in 1977.

== History ==
There is evidence of Roman settlement such as Nottingham Road, a Roman road.

The old village, recorded in the Domesday Book of 1086 as "Cedesene", is situated two and a half miles east of the city. In 1086 it was a manor in the possession of Henry de Ferrers and was worth the sum of three pounds.

The focal point of the village is probably the ancient church of St Mary's. It is important as a dated example of church architecture before the advent of the Perpendicular style. It was rebuilt by Henry Chaddesden, Archdeacon of Leicester, around 1357. The tall and spacious chancel running from its nave and aisle, dates from this period. Its west tower is Perpendicular in style with its big west door and window. Restoration work on the chancel was carried out in 1857 by G. Place.

Chaddesden Hall and its estate were sold in 1918 by the Wilmot family. The estate was immediately divided up and re-sold to multiple purchasers, this process sometimes being repeated with the outcome being house building plots. Roe Farm, formerly at the west end of the parish, was acquired by Derby Corporation in 1930 and became the site of their largest pre-war housing estate. Other major developments in the 1930s were the shopping areas on Nottingham Road, and the Wood Road Estate (Rupert Road, Max Road etc.) from 1936.

== Government ==
The area is covered by the Chaddesden ward of Derby City Council. The ward has three councillors, elected in successive years. Following the May 2019 elections, the ward has three Conservative councillors.

Chaddesden has been part of the Derby North parliamentary constituency since the seat's creation in 1950.

Chaddesden was formerly a civil parish within Shardlow Rural District, on 1 April 1968 the parish was abolished and merged with Derby and Morley and became part of the then county borough of Derby. In 1961 the parish had a population of 15,622. It is now in the unparished area of Derby, in the Derby district.

== Geography ==
Chaddesden lies to the east of Derby city centre, with the A52 road forming its southern boundary. It is bordered by the wards of Spondon, Oakwood, and the Beaufort Street area (named Derwent), with Erewash to the north. The Chaddesden Brook runs southwest through Chaddesden Park towards the River Derwent.

== Demography ==
The population at the 2011 census was 13,413, with 93.7% White British (compared to 75.3% for Derby as a whole).

== Economy ==
The area is primarily residential, with some retail development. The Wyvern Retail Park has a Sainsbury's superstore incorporating an Argos store, Matalan, Halfords, Boots, PureGym, Next, Tapi Carpets, Home Bargains, Costa Coffee Drive-Thru, McDonald's, and The Food Warehouse.

== Culture and community ==
Public facilities in Chaddesden include a public library, and a 22 hectares (54 acres) park. Chaddesden village centre has many amenities including a stores, restaurants, an estate agency, chemist, vets, travel agent, newsagent, hairdresser, optician, two public houses and a 29-bedroom hotel.

Chaddesden Wood and Lime Lane Wood have been designated a Local Nature Reserve.

== Landmarks ==
The Wilmot family lived at Chaddesden Hall, which was demolished in the 1920s when the Wilmot family sold its estate. The grounds are a well used park. The lodge and the entrance to the grave yard on Nottingham Road were designed by H. I. Stevens around 1854. The Wilmot family name still appears in the names of local businesses, including the Wilmot Service Station on Morley Road and their family crest on the former Wilmot Arms Public House (Now the Steaming Billy) at the junction of Morley Road, Chaddesden Lane and Wood Road.

== Transport ==
There is a bus service on Nottingham Road, and cycling Regional Route 66 passes through the area. Derby railway station is 2–3 km (1.2–1.9 mi) away.

== Education ==
Schools in Chaddesden include Lees Brook Community School (secondary school/college), Chaddesden Park Primary School, Cherrytree Hill Primary School, Meadow Farm School, Cavendish Close School, Roe Farm Primary School and St. Albans Catholic Voluntary Academy

== Religious sites ==
St Mary's Church was rebuilt by Henry Chaddesden, Archdeacon of Leicester, in approximately 1347; the chancel dates from this period. It has an ornate rood screen and an unusual chalice shaped font, believed to be over 600 years old. There are monuments to the Wilmot family who were local landlords. In the church yard is a small mound, where six almshouses used to stand. They had been founded by Robert Wilmot.

St. Mark's Church on Francis Street was built in 1938 by Naylor & Sale, and St. Philip's Church on Taddington Road was built in 1955 by S.W. Milburn to service an ever-expanding population. The bell in St. Philip's came from Derwent Woodlands church in Derwent village, which was "drowned" in the 1940s with the building of Ladybower Reservoir (near Bamford).

== Sport ==
There is a children's play area in the park as well as facilities for sports like cricket and football. Lees Brook School is a specialist school of physical education, and also contains facilities for the children.

== Notable people ==
Colonel Sir Henry Wilmot received the VC for bravery. He was born and is buried here.

Sir Henry Fowler Railway Engineer, buried in the Nottingham Road Cemetery.

== See also ==
- Listed buildings in Chaddesden
