= Lees Brook Community School =

Lees Brook Academy

Location
- Morley Road; Chaddesden; Derby, Derbyshire, DE21 4QX; England
- Coordinates: 52.9339°N 1.4232°W

Information
- Type: Academy
- Department for Education URN: 143934 Tables
- Ofsted: Reports
- Executive Principal: Clare Watson
- Head of School: Katy Heffern
- Gender: Co-educational
- Age: 11 to 19
- Website: http://www.leesbrook.co.uk/

Lees Brook Academy (previously Lees Brook Community School or Lees Brook Sports College) is a co-educational secondary school and sixth form located in the Chaddesden area of Derby, in the English county of Derbyshire.

Previously a foundation school administered by Derby City Council, Lees Brook converted to with academy status in September 2011. However the school continues to coordinate with Derby City Council for admissions. The school moved to a new building on the same site in November 2014.

Lees Brook Community School offers GCSEs, BTECs and NCFEs as programmes of study for pupils. The school also operates a vocational sixth form provision.
