= St Mark's Church, Derby =

St Mark’s Church, Derby
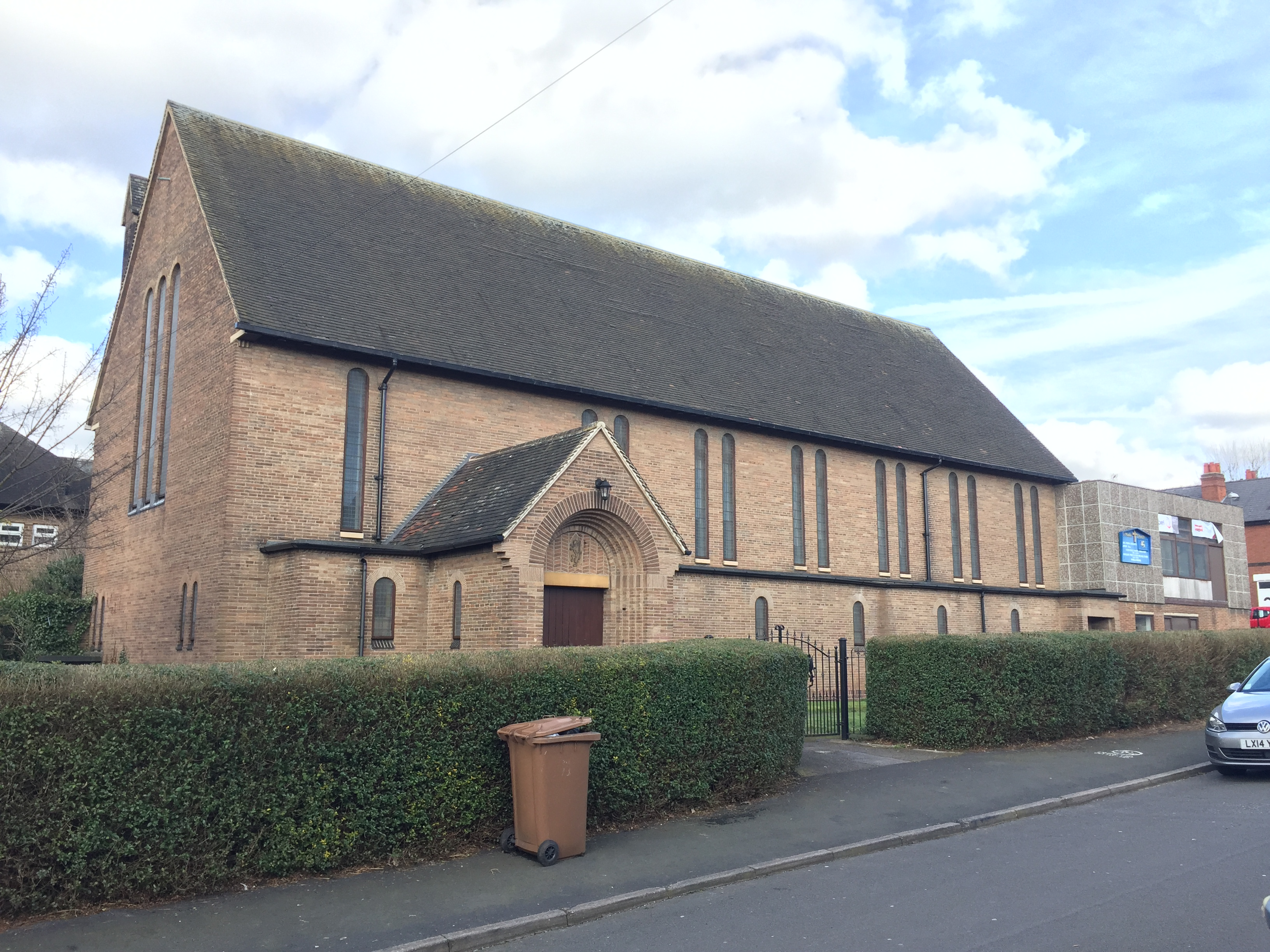
- St Mark’s Church, Derby
- St Mark’s Church, Derby
- 52°55′37.3″N 1°27′13″W
- Location: Chaddesden
- Country: England
- Denomination: Church of England
- Website: stphilip.co.uk

History
- Status: Closed
- Dedication: St Mark

Architecture
- Architect(s): Naylor, Sale and Widdows
- Groundbreaking: 5 January 1935
- Completed: 18 December 1935
- Construction cost: £11,000

Administration
- Diocese: Diocese of Derby
- Archdeaconry: Derby
- Deanery: Derby North
- Parish: St Mark Derby

Clergy
- Vicar: The Revd Peter Dale (2026-present)

St Mark's Church, Derby was a parish church in the Church of England in Chaddesden, Derbyshire.

== History ==
In 1897 a small corrugated iron church was erected at the junction of Francis Street and St Mark's Road, Derby.

The foundation stone for the permanent church was laid on 5 January 1935 by Edith Haslam of Breadsall Priory. The contractor for the construction was J.K. Ford and Weston of Osmaston Road, Derby. The cost was £11,000 (equivalent to £676,385 in 2025). It was opened on 18 December 1935.

The church is ambulatory. There is a series of eight parabolic arches united by reinforced concrete beams at ground level, ambulatory level and roof level, these form the skeleton of the building.

St Philip's Chaddesden forms part of a United Benefice with St Mark's Derby.

St Mark’s church building is currently closed because a storm destroyed the roof. Decisions about the future of the building are currently under consideration by the Church of England in Westminster.

== Organ ==
The church has a pipe organ by Kingsgate Davidson dating from 1935. A specification of the organ can be found on the National Pipe Organ Register.
