= Belper River Gardens =

Park in Belper, Derbyshire, England

River Gardens
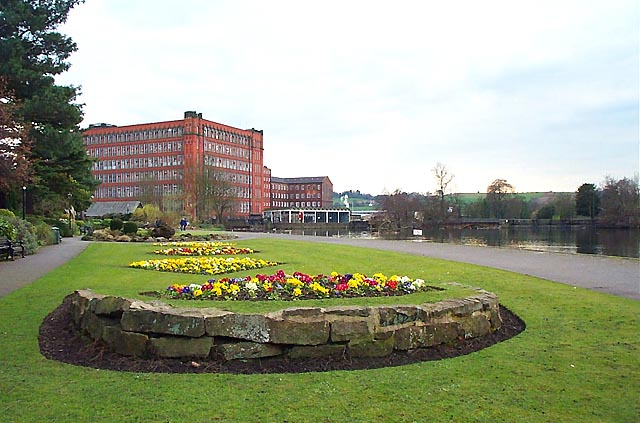
- The River Gardens and North Mill
- Interactive map of River Gardens
- Location: Belper, Derbyshire
- OS grid: SK 34689 48249
- Coordinates: 53°1′48″N 1°29′4″W
- Designer: James Pulham and Son
- Operator: Amber Valley Borough Council
- Designation: Grade II*
- Website: www.ambervalley.gov.uk/environment/parks-and-gardens/belper-river-gardens/

The River Gardens is a public park in Belper, in Derbyshire, England. Its history dates back to 1905, and it is listed Grade II* in Historic England's Register of Parks and Gardens. It has won a Green Flag Award. The park is owned and managed by Amber Valley Borough Council.

== History and description ==
The park, on the northern outskairts of the town, is bounded on the east by the A6 road and on the west by the River Derwent; it is about 250 metres (820 ft) north to south, and is up to 70 metres (230 ft) wide. The gardens are located within Derwent Valley Mills, a World Heritage Site.

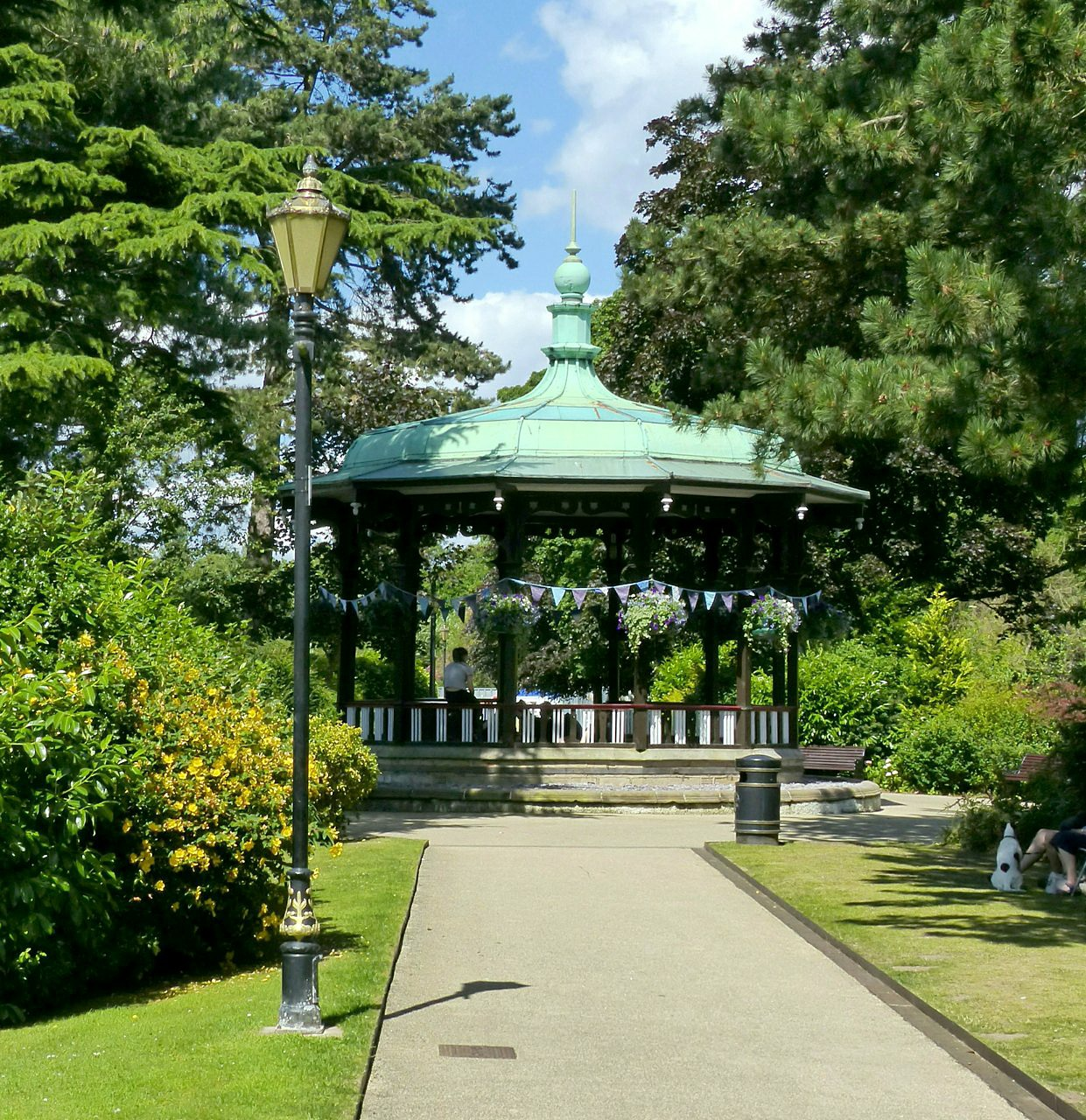
The bandstand

Its history dates from 1905, when the Belper Boating Association was formed. It was supported by George Herbert Strutt, a local businessman, county councillor and JP. He agreed to develop an osier bed, by the River Derwent; this had been used to grow osiers for baskets which were used in Strutt's North Mill, adjacent to the site. A boathouse with a landing stage was built, which was opened on 4 July 1905. Its success led Strutt to make more land available. The ground was landscaped and paths were built, with a promenade by the riverside; a teahouse and a bandstand were built. The layout was designed by James Pulham and Son.

In 1918, Strutt gave the gardens to the English Sewing Cotton Company, after the demise of the Belper Boating Association. It was run as part of the company's leisure facilities for its workers, and was also open to the public. Ownership passed in 1966 to Belper Urban Borough Council, which was succeeded in 1974 by Amber Valley Borough Council. There was restoration and refurbishment in 2007.

The Belper Well Dressing Festival has been held in the gardens since 1997.

== Facilities ==
The park contains lawns, flower beds and Pulhamite rockwork. The bandstand, built in 1906, is Grade II listed. There is a play area, with play equipment relating to the historical industry in the area, to help children understand the local heritage. Boating on the river is available, for a small fee, from mid-May until mid-September from noon on Saturdays, Sundays and Bank Holidays. There is a small car park at the southern end of the park.

The Derwent Valley Visitor Centre is in North Mill, adjacent to the gardens.
