= Coleby =

Coleby is a surname. Notable people with the surname include:

- A. E. Coleby (1876–1930), British film director, actor and screenwriter
- Anja Coleby (born 1971), Australian model, television actress, reporter and producer
- Conrad Coleby (born 1979), Australian actor and photographer
- Egbert Coleby Morland (1874–1955), English physician and medical editor
- JoBeth Coleby-Davis (born 1984), Bahamian Progressive Liberal Party politician and attorney
- Kadeem Coleby (born 1989), Bahamian basketball player
- Robert Coleby (born 1947), Australian actor
- Simon Coleby (born 1967), British comic book artist

== See also ==
- Coleby, North Kesteven, near Lincoln
- Coleby, North Lincolnshire, near Scunthorpe
- Coleby Lombardo (born 1978), former child actor
- RAF Coleby Grange, air force base
