= Bagthorpe Gardens =

Allotments in Nottingham, England

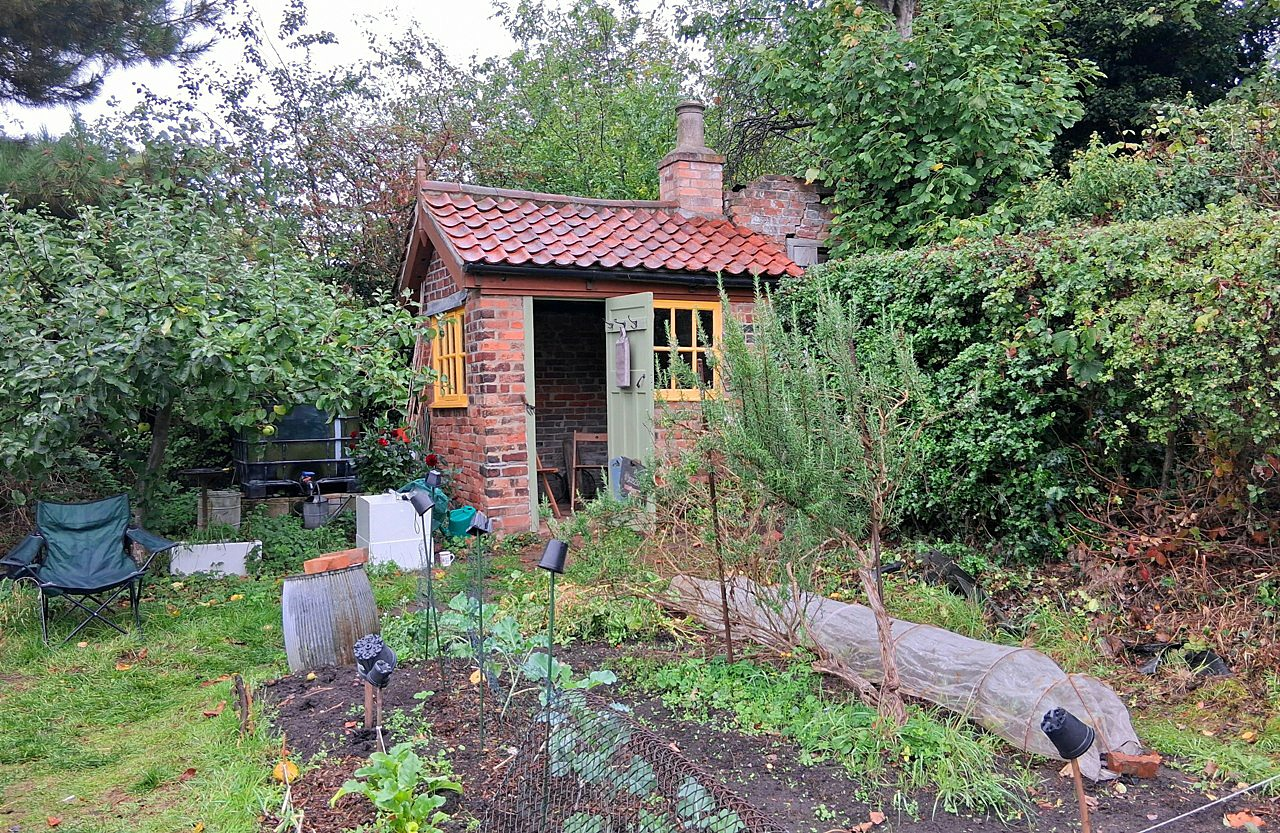
- Interactive map of Bagthorpe Gardens
- Type: Allotments
- Location: Nottingham
- OS grid: SK 56813 42689
- Coordinates: 52°58′43″N 1°9′19″W
- Area: 1.9 hectares (4.7 acres)
- Designation: Grade II*

Bagthorpe Gardens is a group of allotments, about 1.8 miles (2.9 km) north-east of the centre of Nottingham. It is listed Grade II* in Historic England's Register of Parks and Gardens. The entry listing remarks that the allotments are "a significant surviving example of a once abundant but now extremely rare type of garden, of which there are only four other registered examples".

== Background ==
James Orange, the independent minister of Barker Gate Chapel in Nottingham, wrote a pamphlet "A Plea for the Poor" (1841), in which he advocated the provision of allotments for poor people, at a time of depression in the framework knitting trade. The plots would be a quarter of an acre; Orange calculated that this size could support a family for 13 weeks, supplementing a worker's main occupation during a depressed period. The scheme was supported by some landowners.

== History and description ==
The allotments were created in 1842, when Ichabod Charles Wright of Mapperley Hall made land available for 60 allotment gardens. In 1870, 24 more plots were created north of Haydn Road. These were built over by 1915, and more plots were lost to housing during the 1920s and 1930s.

There are now 36 gardens, in an area of about 1.9 hectares (4.7 acres), in three rows from north to south. There are entrances from Haydn Road to the north and from Clandon Drive and Aubrey Road to the south. West Avenue runs along the west side of the first row, and East Avenue runs between the second and third rows. The plots are separated by hedges, and most are still in cultivation. In about thirteen gardens the 19th-century brick-built "bothies" survive, of which about three still have fireplaces.

== Other listed garden allotments ==
- Hill Close Gardens, Warwick
- St Ann's Allotments, Nottingham
- Stoney Road Allotments, Coventry
- Westbourne Road Town Gardens, Birmingham
