= Hartsholme Country Park =

Country park in Lincoln, East Midlands

Coordinates: 53°12′45″N 00°35′15″W

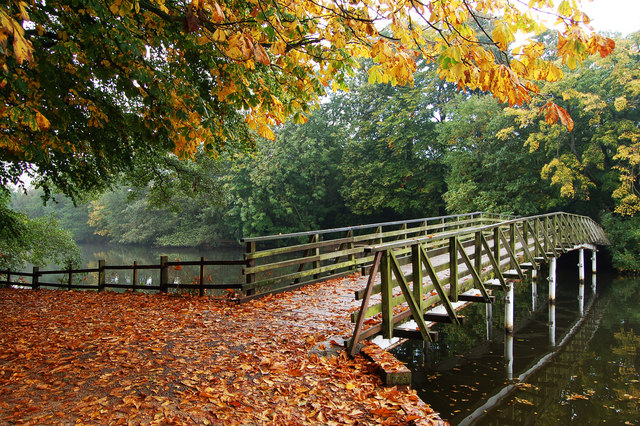
- The white bridge
- Type: Country park
- Location: Lincoln
- Area: 200 acres (81 ha)
- Created: 1862
- Operator: Lincoln City Council

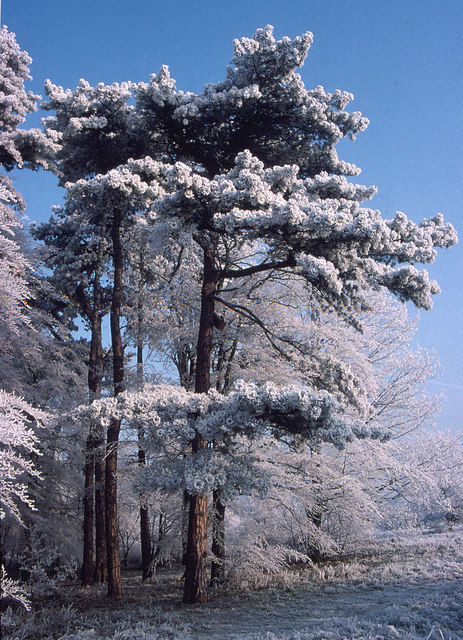
March 1993 in Hartsholme Park

Hartsholme Country Park lies about 3 miles (5 km) southwest of the city centre of Lincoln in the East Midlands of England. Access is from the Skellingthorpe Road (B1378).

Hartsholme Country Park covers more than 200 acres (80 ha) and was designated in 1974 and opened in 1979. It contains a camping area for tents, caravans and motor caravans. It is Grade II listed.

The Park centres on lakes and ornamental grounds originally the work of Edward Milnerin 1862, landscaping the area around a reservoir of 1848. They were built along with a home, Hartsholme Hall, which was demolished in 1951, around the time the grounds became a public park.

In July 2012 the White Bridge was closed, and the deck removed in September, for safety reasons. This was a footbridge built in 1962, on the pylons of the earlier 1902 bridge. Closure interrupts a public right-of-way across the lake. A replacement bridge using the original 1902 supports reopened on 7 March 2014.

Hartsholme Park has often been awarded a Green Flag Award, including in 2011 and 2013. These are awarded annually by the charity Keep Britain Tidy.
