= St Ann's Allotments =

Allotments in Nottingham, England

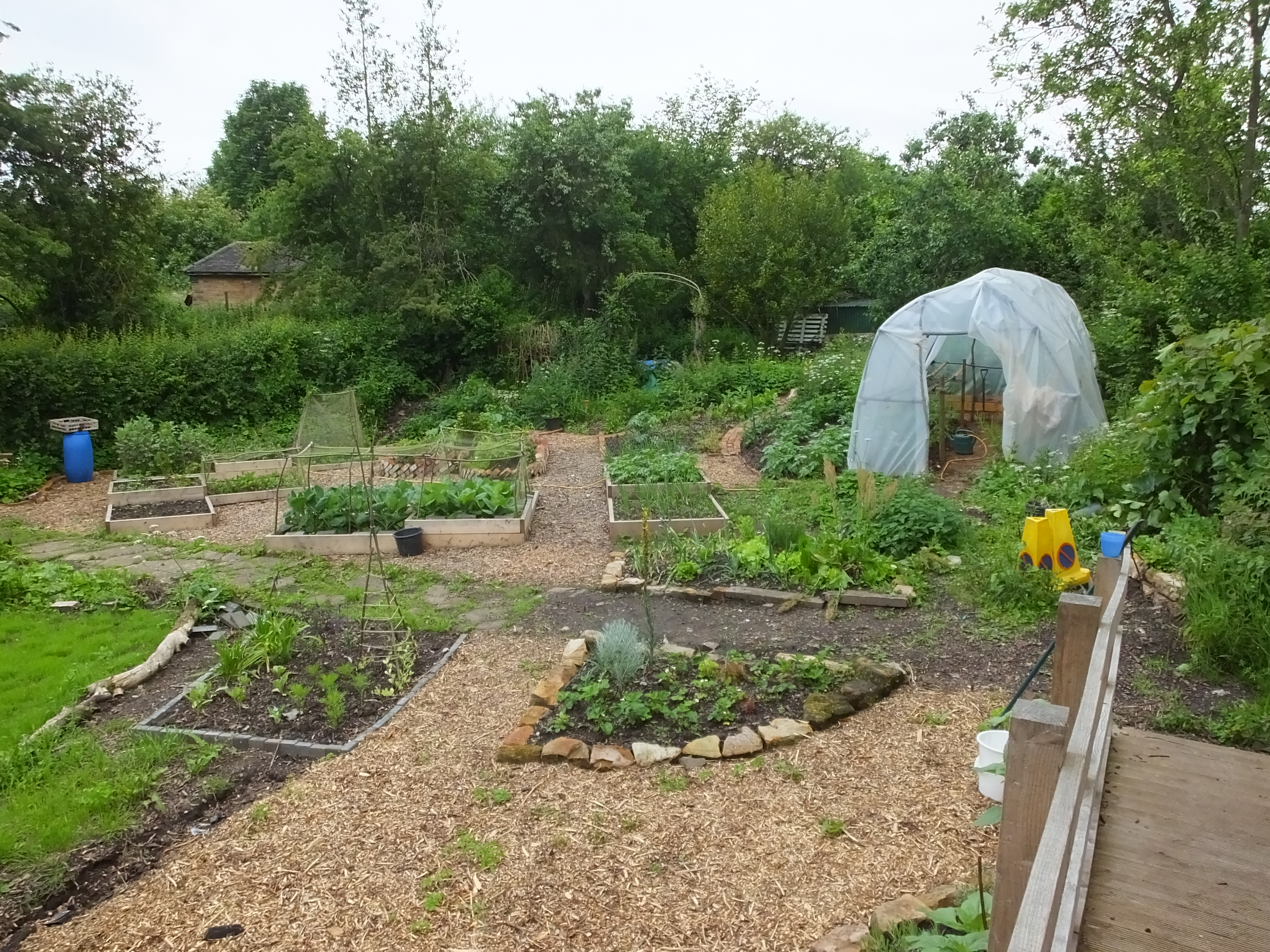
- A view of the allotments
- Interactive map of St Ann's Allotments
- Type: Allotments
- Location: St Ann's, Nottingham
- OS grid: SK 581 416
- Coordinates: 52.9681°N 1.1346°W
- Designation: Grade II*

St Ann's Allotments is a group of allotments, in use since the 19th century, in St Ann's, Nottingham, England, about a mile north-east of the centre of Nottingham. It is listed Grade II* in Historic England's Register of Parks and Gardens. The entry listing remarks that this site, comprising Hungerhill Gardens, Stonepit Coppice Gardens and Gorseyclose Gardens, "represents the most extensive surviving detached town garden site in England".

== History ==
Land including Hunger Hill was granted to the Corporation of Nottingham by Edward VI in 1551; the revenue from this was applied to the upkeep of the Trent Bridge. Hunger Hill was enclosed in 1604 to 1605, and plots were let to 30 burgesses and their widows. This continued until 1842, when the Nottingham Independent Cottage Garden Society petitioned the corporation for allotment gardens because of poverty and hardship; they were granted 50 gardens in Hungerhill Gardens. By the late 19th century there were many more gardens, separated by hedges or fences, many with summerhouses and glasshouses. In the 1880s the Corporation considered developing parts of the gardens, but were opposed by the Independent Cottage Garden Society, and the plan was dropped by 1900. Sycamore Recreation Ground was created in 1909, and some gardens were lost in the area now separating Hungerhill Gardens and Gorseyclose Gardens.

Hungerhill Gardens, Stonepit Coppice Gardens and Gorseyclose Gardens are part of the Bridge Estate, property of Nottingham City Council, still providing revenue for the upkeep of the Trent Bridge.

== Description ==
In Hungerhill Gardens there are 456 plots in an area of about 21 hectares (52 acres); the terrain has slopes to the west, south and south-east, and there are wide views of surrounding areas. Stonepit Coppice Gardens is immediately north of Hungerhill Gardens, lying on north-east and south-east facing slopes; it has 201 plots in about 9 hectares (22 acres). Gorseyclose Gardens, on level ground, about 100 metres (330 ft) west of Hungerhill Gardens and separated from it by Sycamore Recreation Ground, has 50 plots in about 2 hectares (4.9 acres).

The plots are rectangular, enclosed by high hedges; in Hungerhill Gardens and Stonepit Coppice Gardens there is terracing to provide level plots. Most remain in cultivation as allotments. Many plots have summerhouses, built in the mid 19th century to the early 20th century. There are glasshouses, some dating from the 19th century. The building on plot B305 of Hungerhill Gardens, a timber shed with an interior fireplace, dating from the late 19th century, is a Grade II listed building.

== Other listed garden allotments ==
- Bagthorpe Gardens, Nottingham
- Hill Close Gardens, Warwick
- Stoney Road Allotments, Coventry
- Westbourne Road Town Gardens, Birmingham

== See also ==
- Listed buildings in Nottingham (St Ann's ward)
