= Hartstonge =

Hartstonge may refer to:

- John Hartstonge (1654–1717), English-born Church of Ireland bishop
- Sir Henry Hartstonge, 3rd Baronet (c. 1725–1797), Irish politician and landowner
- Price Hartstonge (1692–1743), Anglo-Irish politician
- Standish Hartstonge (disambiguation), multiple people
