= Hartstonge baronets =

Extinct baronetcy in the Baronetage of Ireland

The Hartstonge Baronetcy, of Bruff in the County of Limerick, was a title in the Baronetage of Ireland. It was created on 20 April 1681 for Standish Hartstonge, an English-born judge who sat on the Irish Court of Exchequer, and who had inherited estates at Bruff from his mother's family, the Standishes. The second Baronet, his grandson, was a member of the Irish House of Commons for Kilmallock, Ratoath and St Canice. The third Baronet was a member of the Irish Parliament for County Limerick. The title became extinct on his death in 1797, when the Hartstonge estates passed by inheritance to the Earl of Limerick.

Price Hartstonge, the eldest surviving son of the second Baronet, (but who predeceased his father), was a member of the Irish House of Commons for Charleville. John Hartstonge, Bishop of Derry was the third son of the first Baronet. Lucy Hartstonge, wife of the third Baronet, was a noted philanthropist.

== Hartstonge baronets, of Bruff (1681) ==
- Sir Standish Hartstonge, 1st Baronet (c. 1630 – c. 1700)
- Sir Standish Hartstonge, 2nd Baronet (c. 1672–1751)
- Sir Henry Hartstonge, 3rd Baronet (c. 1725–1797)
