= Standish Hartstonge =

Standish Hartstonge may refer to:

- Sir Standish Hartstonge, 1st Baronet (1627–1701), English-born Irish judge; MP for Limerick City (1661–66)
- Standish Hartstonge (Kilkenny City MP) (1656–1704), MP for Kilkenny City (1695–1704); son of the 1st baronet and uncle of the 2nd baronet
- Sir Standish Hartstonge, 2nd Baronet (c. 1671/1673 – 1751), MP for Kilmallock (1695–1703) Ratoath (1703–13) Irishtown (1713–27)
