= Old Catton =

Village in Norfolk, England

Coordinates: 52.6611°N 1.3023°E

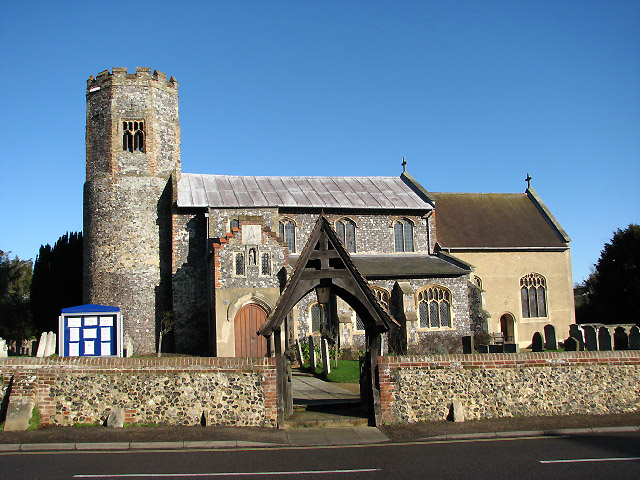
- Church of St. Margaret, Old Catton, typical of Norfolk round tower designs.

- Location within Norfolk
- Area: 2.33 km^{2} (0.90 sq mi)
- Population: 1,867 (2023)
  - Density: 801/km^{2} (2,070/sq mi)
- OS grid reference: TG234121
- Civil parish: Old Catton
- District: Broadland
- Shire county: Norfolk
- Region: East
- Country: England
- Sovereign state: United Kingdom
- Post town: NORWICH
- Postcode district: NR6
- Dialling code: 01603
- Police: Norfolk
- Fire: Norfolk
- Ambulance: East of England
- UK Parliament: Norwich North

Old Catton is a suburban village and civil parish in the English county of Norfolk which is 2 miles (3.2 km) to the north-east of central Norwich. The parish is bounded by the Norwich International Airport at Hellesdon to the west and Sprowston to the east. The northern boundary is with the village of Spixworth, while the A1042 road forms the southern boundary.

The parish covers an area of 2.33 km^{2} (0.90 sq mi) and had a population of 5,954 in 2,512 households at the 2001 census, increasing to 6,108 in 2,666 households at the 2011 Census.

For the purposes of local government, Old Catton falls within the district of Broadland. It is twinned with the French commune of Lavaré.

== Historical development ==
The name of Catton most likely means farmstead (or Tun) of a man called Catta, a local tribal leader. Another possible explanation was the presence of wild cats in the area – now depicted on the village sign. The settlement was recorded in the Domesday Book of 1086. Until recent times Catton was an agricultural village but following the late 18th and 19th century development of the Catton Park estate several wealthy Norwich families including the Gurneys, Jewsons, Buxtons, Lindleys, Norman and the Tilletts built their houses here.

== Old Catton conservation area ==
The conservation area was designated in 1986 and encompasses three important open spaces: Catton Park, Buttercup Meadow, the War Memorial deer park and the historical core of the village: Church Street, Spixworth Road and George Hill. Contained within this area are several listed buildings, significant non– listed buildings, protected trees and parkland.

== Amenities ==
Due to its close proximity to Norwich, the village is a popular residential area. Amenities in Old Catton include a primary and a nursery school, medical practice, veterinary surgery, dental surgery and a range of privately owned businesses.

There are two public houses: the Maids Head and the Woodman are both located in the centre of the village.

The recreation ground adjacent to Church Street is home to the Old Catton Junior Football Club and the village cricket team, which plays in the Norfolk Cricket league.

Lavare Park is located to the north of the village at Spixworth Road and offers various facilities including a full size football pitch. The park is named after the French commune of Lavaré which is twinned with Old Catton.

== Transport ==
Bus services in the area are provided primarily by First Eastern Counties and Sanders Coaches. First route 13, on the Turquoise Line, serves the city centre, Attleborough, Wymondham, Hethersett and Spixworth. Route 21 and 21A, on the Orange Line, serves the city centre, Bowthorpe, Earlham and the Norfolk and Norwich University Hospital. Sanders routes 54 and X55 both travel to North Walsham, through Buxton and Badersfield (54) and Coltishall and Scottow (X55).

The nearest National Rail station is Norwich; it provides direct trains to locations throughout East Anglia and to London, operated by Greater Anglia.

== Notable buildings and structures ==
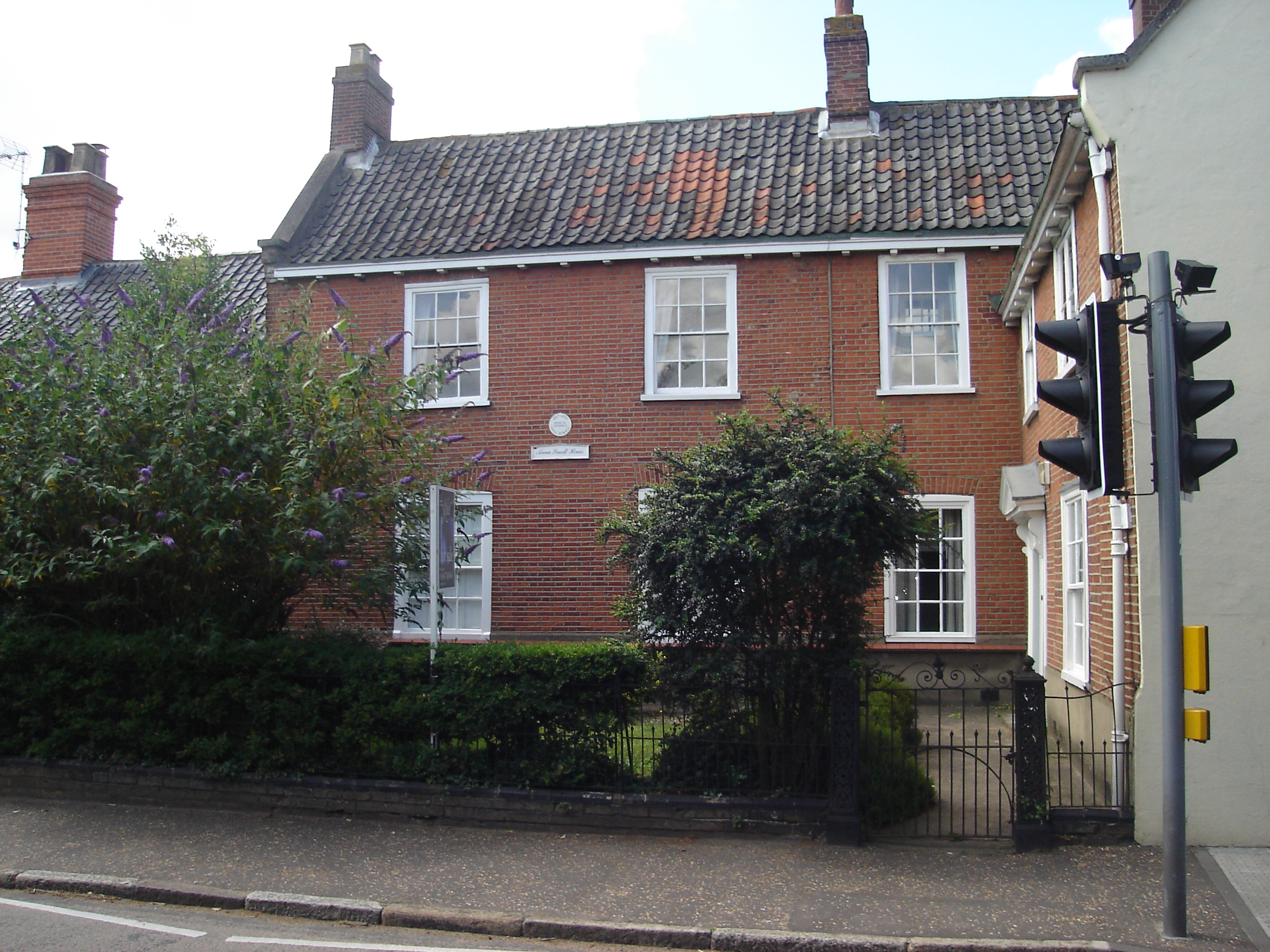
Anna Sewell house

The Church of St Margaret, is a round tower flint design with extensions. The tower is built of flint with an octagonal top of brick and flint which was fashionable in the 15th century. The majority of the alterations to the building took place in the 15th and 19th centuries. Memorials inside the church include Richard Westmacott's 1820 memorial to the Mayor of Norwich; Jeremiah Ives. Also of note are several wall tablets of the 18th, 19th and 20th centuries. It is one of 124 existing round tower churches in Norfolk.

Catton Hall, the hall was built c1780 for the High Steward of Norwich – Charles Buckle. In 1788 the hall and estate passed into the hands of Jeremiah Ives (1754–1820) –twice Mayor of Norwich. Today, it is privately owned and divided into separate apartments.

Catton Park, set around (the new) Catton Hall was laid out by Humphry Repton in 1788 and was his first paid commission though not a subject of one of his famous "Red Books". The park (and the adjoining War memorial deer park and Buttercup Meadow) are designated Grade II* on the English Heritage Register of Parks and Gardens of Special Historic Interest in England. Some 28 hectares (69 acres) of parkland remain, and this area is undergoing restoration to open it to community use. Most of the park to the north has been used for a modern housing development, though within it the former laundry and some of the perimeter wall of the Hall remains.

The Ornamental Pond, the small gated garden at Parkside Drive contains remnants of Repton's original garden including a listed clamshell fountain set in a small oval pond. The garden is in the care of the Old Catton Society.

Catton Old Hall, is located outside of the conservation area at Lodge Lane. The house was built in 1632 as a 'gentlemen's house' by William Bussey. Today, the property is used as a hotel.

The Orangery, the 18th century Grade II listed building has seen a variety of uses. Originally an orangery adjacent to Catton Hall, it has been a museum for the Buxton family, and later as a voluntary aid hospital during the Great War. Today, the building serves as the village hall. The gates leading to the building were commissioned by Samuel Gurney Buxton of Catton Hall and made by the village blacksmith, William Badcock.

Anna Sewell House, Anna Sewell and her parents moved into the house at Spixworth Road in September 1867. She began writing the children's classic Black Beauty here in 1871 and completed her book in 1877. Sewell died in the house in 1878.

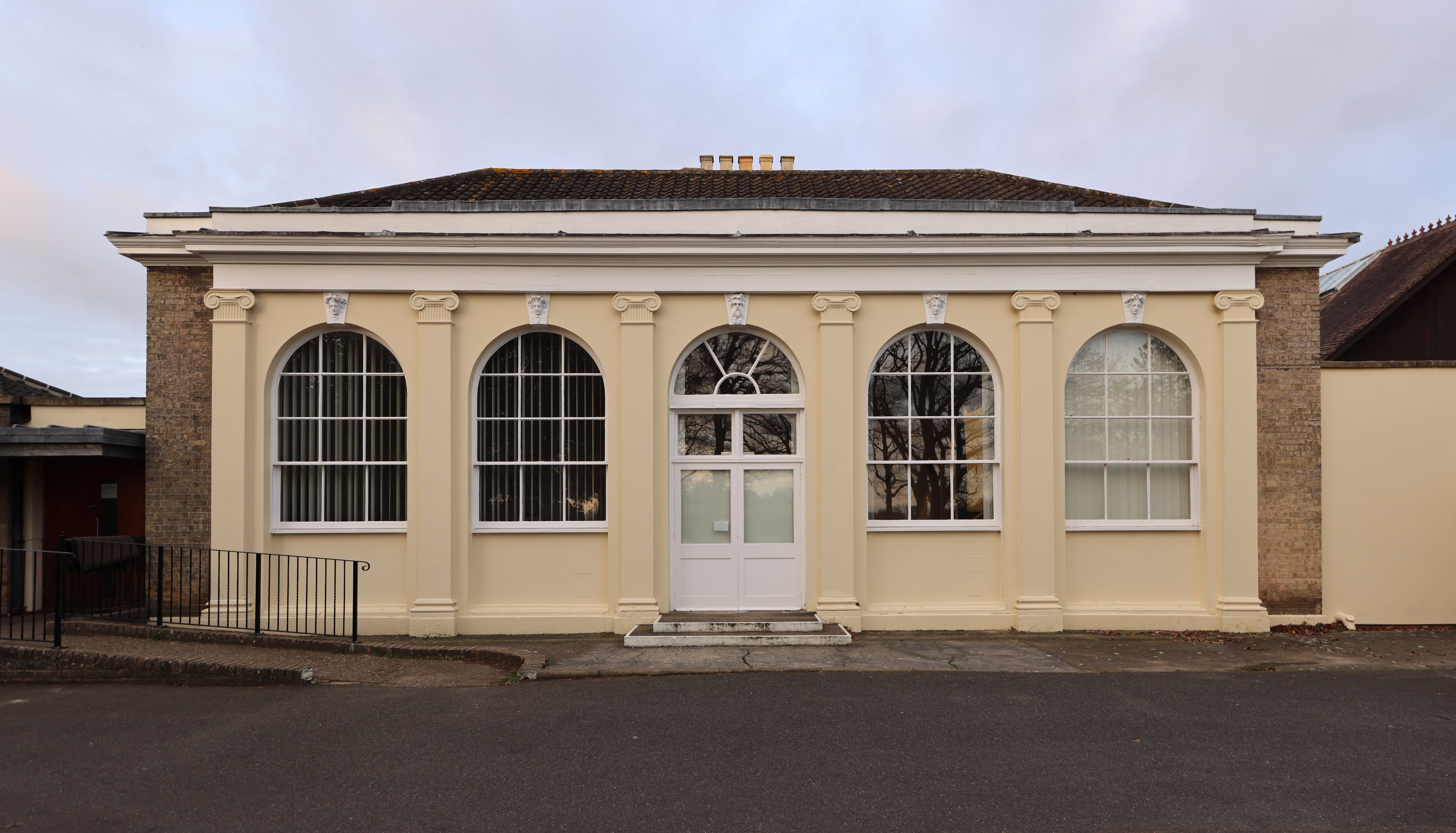
The orangery

== Notable people ==
- Elliott Gunton, cybercriminal
- Sir Standish Hartstonge, 1st Baronet, judge and founder of a prominent Irish political dynasty
- John Lindley FRS (1799–1865), botanist, gardener and orchidologist
- Barry Pinches, snooker player
- Anna Sewell, wrote Black Beauty while living in Old Catton
