= Sir Standish Hartstonge, 2nd Baronet =

Irish politician and landowner

Sir Standish Hartstonge, 2nd Baronet (c. 1671/1673 – 1751) was an Anglo-Irish landowner and politician, who sat in the Irish House of Commons for many years. His marriage, which took place when he was only about 18 or 19 years old, caused a bitter family feud which led to many years of controversy and litigation.

== Early life ==
He was born between 1671 and 1673, probably in Cork. He was the only surviving son of Francis Hartstonge of Rockbarton, near Bruff, County Limerick, and his wife Mary Brettridge, one of the three daughters and co-heiresses of Captain Roger Brettridge (1630–1683) of Castles Brettridge, Cope and Magner, County Cork and his wife Jane Hakby. Francis was the eldest son of Sir Standish Hartstonge, 1st Baronet, an eminent lawyer, originally from Norfolk, who was twice Baron of the Court of Exchequer (Ireland), by his first wife Elizabeth Jermyn (or Jermy) of Gunton Hall. Francis died in 1688, and Standish went to live with his grandfather, who was living in retirement in Herefordshire. Standish was assigned a room in Trinity College Dublin in 1686, for use by himself and his descendants. It is unclear whether he actually studied there, although his son and grandson were both Trinity alumni. It is likely that he did know some law, as he later held a minor judicial post.

== Family quarrels ==
Within two years of his arrival in Hereford, young Standish had quarrelled bitterly with his grandfather, causing a feud which involved the entire Hartstonge family. The cause of the quarrel was his marriage: in about 1690, when he was still in his teens, young Standish married Anne Price of Presteigne, Radnorshire, daughter of Mr. Justice Price; Anne was about six years older than her husband. His grandfather's anger about the marriage is still evident in his will, which was drawn up almost ten years later: as to "my grandchild who disobliged me by his marriage; I shall only say God give him joy of it, but I shall not add to it for that cause." Apart from the failure to consult him on such a vital matter, and his grandson's youth, he apparently objected to the bride's family, who were heavily in debt. This was an issue on which the old man no doubt felt strongly, as in his later years he had himself married into a notoriously debt-ridden family, the Gwynnes of Llanelwedd; his brother-in-law, Sir Rowland Gwynne, was to die in a debtors' prison.

The elder Standish returned to Ireland about 1691 to serve for a second term as Baron of the Exchequer; young Standish and his family continued to live in Hereford for some time, but settled permanently in Ireland in the mid-1690s. His grandfather is thought to have died in August 1701.

The will in which Standish's grandfather expressed his strong disapproval of his grandson's marriage to Anne Price left much of the property to Gwynne, the old man's teenage son by his third wife, Joanne Gwynne. He may reasonably have felt that young Standish was already well provided for since he had inherited substantial estates in Limerick and Cork from his parents. Standish, however, brought a lawsuit in 1702 against Gwynne and his two other uncles Standish and John, seeking to have the will set aside. As far as can be determined from the records, the action went in favour of young Gwynne, who died unmarried in his early twenties. The younger Standish's uncle, another Standish Hartstonge, also explicitly cut him out of his will when he died in 1704.

== Early career ==
In 1701 Standish was made second justice, or Master of the Rolls, of the Palatine Court of Tipperary. This office was generally regarded as a sinecure: it is not clear if he had any formal legal training, nor whether he had been called to the Bar. His appointment indicates that he, like his uncle John, the future Bishop, was a client of James Butler, 2nd Duke of Ormond. The Palatine of Tipperary was Ormond's personal feudal court, and he had the right to appoint the judges and other officials. The Court was abolished in 1715 by the County Palatine of Tipperary Act 1715. Standish's career does not seem to have suffered as a result of Ormond's downfall, when he was exposed as a Jacobite and fled into exile in 1715.

Standish took down and rebuilt the memorial in St Peter's Church, Bruff, to his great-great-grandfather Sir Thomas Standish of Bruff and Surrey, which had originally been erected by the first Sir Standish in c.1676, and which contains some useful information about the family.

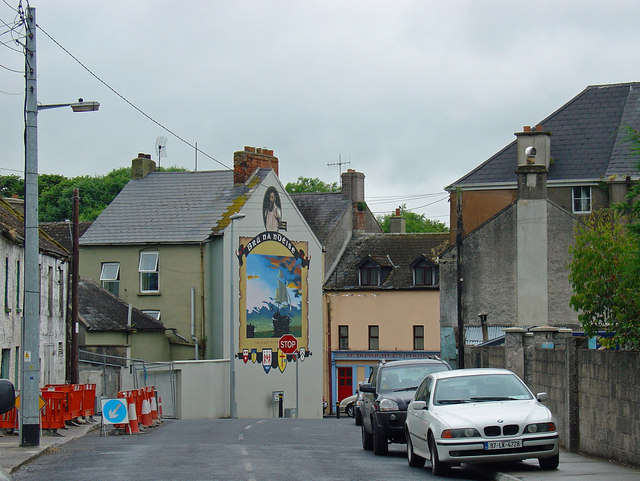
Bruff, County Limerick, where the Hartstonge family had their main Irish estates

== Later career ==
Although they had quarrelled over the Hartstonge inheritance, Standish was generally on good terms with the most influential of his relations, his uncle John Hartstonge, Bishop of Ossory, who had married one of the ladies of the Royal Bedchamber. With the Bishop's backing, Standish entered the Irish House of Commons. He sat as MP first for Kilmallock, then Ratoath and finally St. Canice, whose other MP was Sir Robert Maude, his uncle by marriage. He died, aged almost eighty, in 1751.

== Descendants ==
By his marriage to Anne Price, Hartstonge had at least five children: Price, John, Catherine and two others who died in infancy. His elder surviving son, Price Hartstonge, followed his father into Parliament, but died before him in 1743. The title passed to Price's only son Sir Henry Hartstonge, 3rd Baronet.

Parliament of Ireland
Preceded by John Ormsby; Robert Ormsby	Member of Parliament for Kilmallock; 1695–1703; With: Chidley Coote	Succeeded by John Ormsby; Robert Oliver
Preceded by Richard Gorges; Edward Forde	Member of Parliament for Ratoath; 1703–1713; With: Edward Forde 1703–1705; George Lowther 1705–1713	Succeeded by George Lowther; Richard Gorges
Preceded by Richard Connell; Richard Cole	Member of Parliament for St Canice; 1713–1727; With: Sir Robert Maude	Succeeded by James Agar; Richard Dawson
Baronetage of Ireland
Preceded by Standish Hartstonge	Baronet (of Bruff, Limerick) c. 1700–1751	Succeeded by Henry Hartstonge
