= Sir Henry Hartstonge, 3rd Baronet =

Irish politician and landowner

Sir Henry Hartstonge, 3rd Baronet (c. 1725 – 1797) was an Anglo-Irish politician and landowner who sat in the Irish House of Commons as member for County Limerick. He was a close political associate of his influential brother-in-law Edmund Pery, 1st Viscount Pery. He gave his name to Hartstonge Street, Limerick.

== Family ==
He was born at Bruff, County Limerick, only son of Price Hartstonge, MP for Charleville, and Alice Widenham, daughter and co-heiress of Henry Widenham of Kildimo. Price was the eldest surviving son of Sir Standish Hartstonge, 2nd Baronet, but he died before his father, so Henry inherited the title on his grandfather's death in 1751. The Hartstonges, who were originally from Norfolk, inherited Bruff from the Standish family in the middle of the seventeenth century. Thereafter they lived mainly in Ireland, and over the course of the next century they became substantial landowners in counties Limerick, Cork and Tipperary. Henry was educated at Trinity College Dublin of which he was later a benefactor.

== Marriage and career ==
Henry married Lucy Pery, daughter of the Rev. Stackpole Pery and Jane Twigge, and sister of Edmund Pery, 1st Viscount Pery and of William Pery, 1st Baron Glentworth. Viscount Pery, who was Speaker of the Irish House of Commons 1771–1785, was one of the most influential politicians in Ireland of his day and Henry was always closely associated with the Pery interest. He sat in the House of Commons as an MP for Limerick County 1776–1790.

== Personality ==
He has been described as a popular and convivial character, who resembled the celebrated Irish "character" Sir Boyle Roche in personality. He was also accused of being an absentee landlord who spent most of his time in England and neglected his estates in Ireland. This however may be an unfair judgment since there is evidence that he worked closely with the Perys in the development of Limerick City, particularly the laying out of Newtown Pery and the building of the new Bishop's Palace. His wife Lucy was renowned for her charitable work in Limerick, particularly the foundation of what is now St. John's Hospital, Limerick. The couple gave their name to Hartstonge Street.

He was said to be incapable of making a speech in public, so that his brother-in-law Edmund, who was Speaker of the Irish House of Commons for many years, would simply ignore his demands to address the House, despite his regular cry "Damn it, Edmund, I will speak!".

== Inheritance ==
Henry had no children and the baronetcy died with him. Lucy had died in 1794. The bulk of the Hartstonge estates passed at his death to his niece Mary Alice Ormsby (died 1850), daughter of his only sister Mary, who married Henry Ormsby of Cloghan, County Mayo. Mary Alice married Lucy Hartstonge's nephew Edmund Pery, 2nd Baron Glentworth, who as his reward for supporting the Act of Union was created Earl of Limerick in 1803.

Baronetage of Ireland
Preceded by Standish Hartstonge	Baronet (of Bruff); 1751–1797	Extinct
