= Victor Griffin =

Irish Anglican priest

Victor Gilbert Benjamin Griffin (Dean Griffin) (24 May 1924 – 11 January 2017) was a Church of Ireland (Anglican) priest, theologian and author and a strongly liberal voice in Irish public life.

Born in Carnew, County Wicklow, Griffin was educated at Kilkenny College and Trinity College, Dublin, where he was elected a scholar and awarded the Luce, Bernard, Wray and Macren prizes for philosophy and metaphysical studies. He had a long and mutually satisfying relationship with Trinity in his years in ministry in Dublin.

He was married to Daphne who died from MS on 16 January 1998. They had twin sons Timothy (died 5 June 2012) and Kevin, both married and Griffin has five grandchildren.

== Church career ==
He was ordained in 1948. He held curacies at St Augustine's in Derry then at Christ Church, in the same city. He became rector of Christ Church in 1957, serving until 1969.

He was first prebendary of Howth in St. Patrick's Cathedral, Dublin (1962–1968) then dean from 1969 until 1991 and when he completed his term he was regarded by some commentators as "the great Dean of the twentieth century."

Griffin's ministry in Dublin was characterised by an openness and inclusivity, a building of bridges to other traditions and he was among the first public figures to recognise the wider changes in Irish public life. Among the causes he adopted were: strong support for the Irish anti-apartheid campaign; his endorsement of, and canvassing for both Mary Robinson and David Norris (politician); trenchant opposition to the campaign for the Eighth Amendment of the Constitution of Ireland; Tenth Amendment of the Constitution Bill 1986; and the campaign to preserve Liberties of Dublin and renovate the inner city.

== Author ==
He was the author of several books including:

- Anglican and Irish: What We Believe (1976)
- Mark of Protest (1993)
- Enough Religion to Make Us Hate (2002)
- A short catechism of basic Church teaching (2007)

== Personal life ==
He lived in retirement in Limavady, Northern Ireland, until his death in 2017.
