= Catton Park, Norwich =

Public park in Norfolk, England

Catton Park
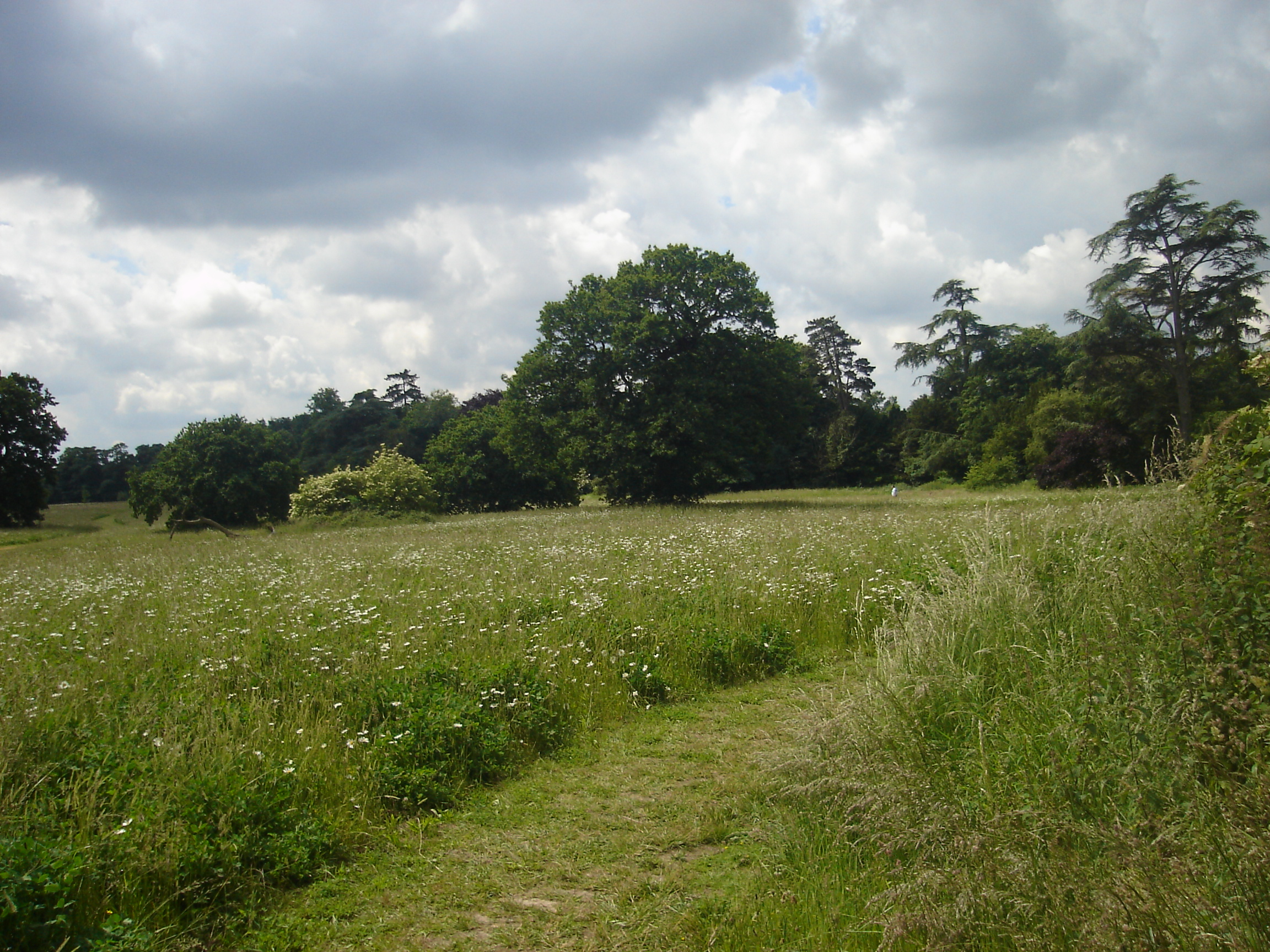
- Interactive map of Catton Park
- Type: Urban park
- Location: Old Catton, Norwich, Norfolk
- Coordinates: 52.6579°N 1.2945°E
- Area: 70 acres (28 ha)
- Open: All year

Catton Park is a Grade II* listed public park located in the village of Old Catton some 2 miles (3.2 km) north of central Norwich. The park covers 70 acres (28 ha) and was landscape gardener Humphry Repton's first commission. Adjacent, but outside the boundary of the present today park are two open spaces; the War Memorial Deer Park at Spixworth Road and the Buttercup Meadow at the junction of Oak Lane and Spixworth Road. Both were historically part of Catton Park and together with Catton Hall form part of the Old Catton conservation area.

== History ==
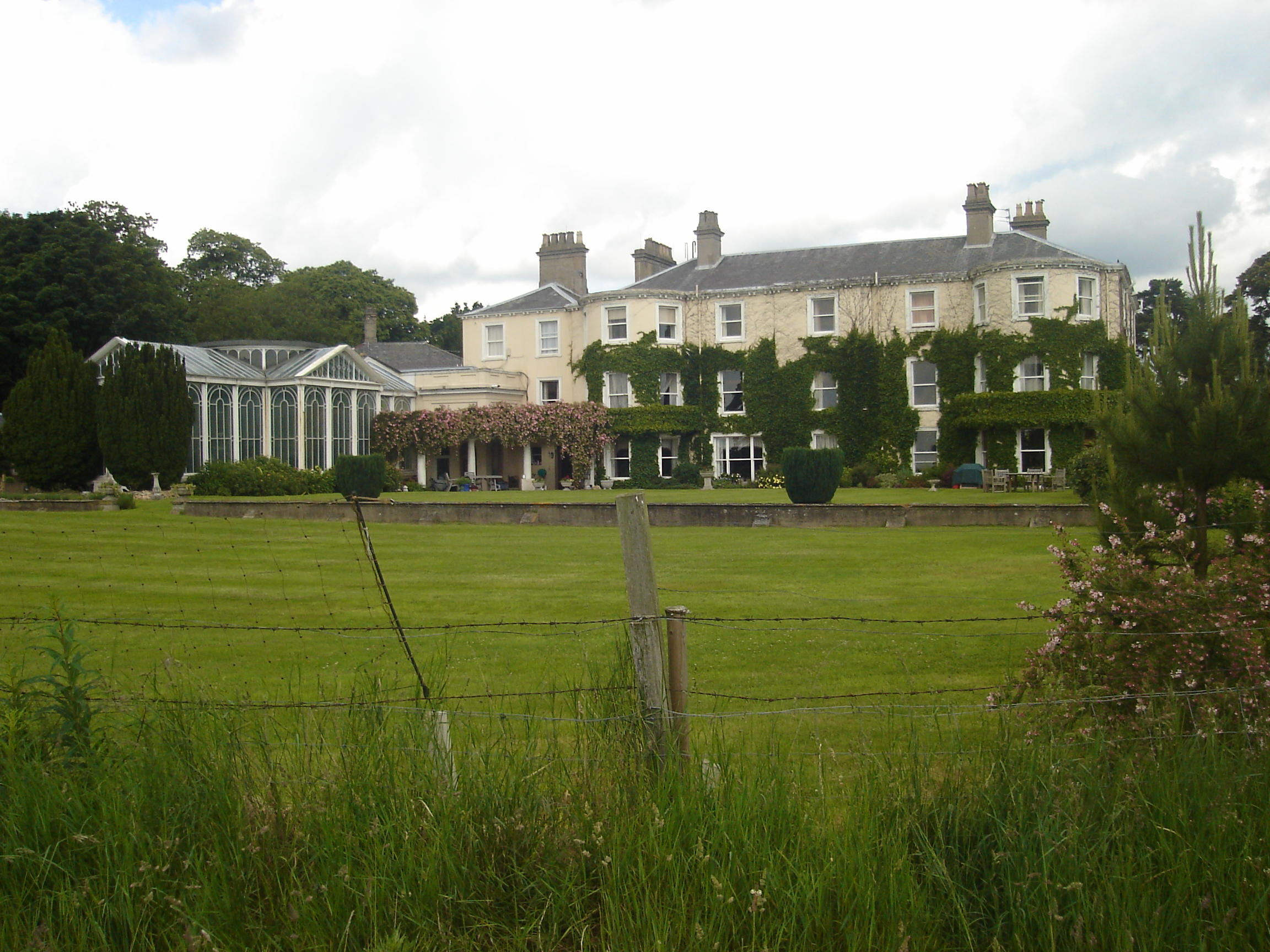
Catton Hall

By the 1770s, land had been purchased and developed as an estate for occasional residence with the building of Catton Hall by Charles Buckle, High Steward of Norwich in c1780. In 1788 the Catton Hall estate passed into the hands of Jeremiah Ives (1754–1820) – twice Mayor of Norwich. Shortly after acquiring the estate, Ives consulted Repton who accepted the commission to landscape the park. Despite further alterations over the next 150 years, it remained a country park until the outbreak of World War II. Open areas of the park were given over to arable farming and ploughed up. After the war much of the park was broken up and mostly sold for residential development. Subsequent years of farming left just the 'bare bones' of Repton's original design. However, in 2005 the local community began an ambitious plan for the restoration and regeneration of the park with the aid of funding from the Heritage Lottery Fund. This was achieved along with support from Natural England and the local councils. In October, 2007 the park was formally opened to the public by the Duke of Kent. Today, the park is managed by the Catton Park Trust with support from Broadland District Council, Norfolk County Council and the parish council. In September 2010 the Catton Park Trust announced it had secured permission from English Heritage to build a new warden's office and education building. The £250,000 single storey structure finished in sweet chestnut will be adjacent to the Oak Lane entrance.

== Humphry Repton ==
Catton was his first commission as a landscape gardener. Jeremiah Ives consulted him when he acquired the estate in 1788 and again in 1790. The main work was probably additional planting and landscaping. Other proposed alterations included a Ha-ha and a new entrance. Two of Repton's watercolours survive which show his improvements. At this stage he had not developed his 'before and after' technique found in his Red Books. Other work included the removal of trees to the south of the park to provide a view of the spire of Norwich Cathedral.

== Description ==
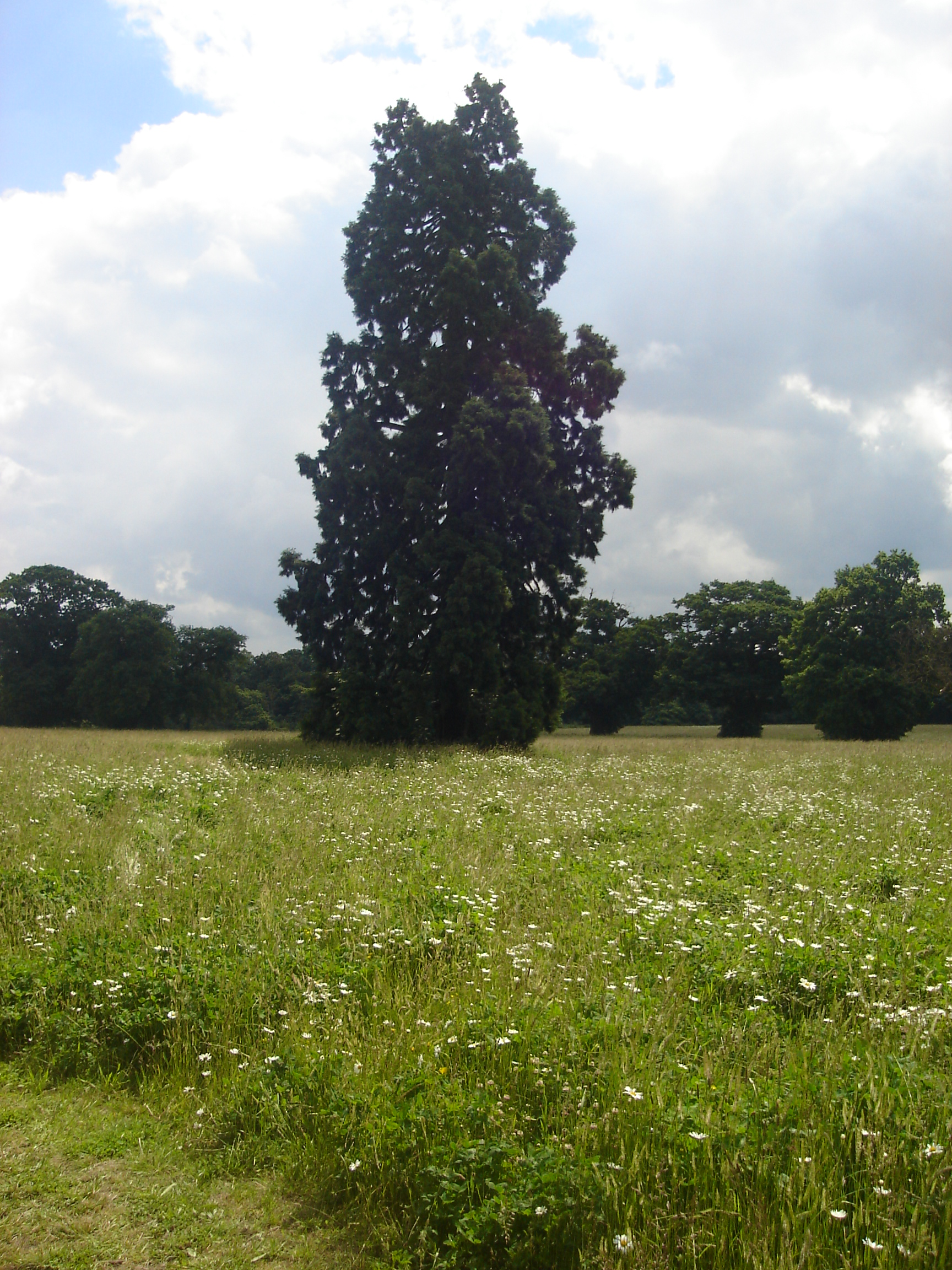
Wellingtonia

Much of the park is open grassland sown with a mixture of grasses and wildflowers. There are notable specimen wellingtonia, cedar and ancient oaks scattered throughout the park. Mixed woodland containing oak, sweet chestnut, and yew make up much of the boundaries. Improvements in the early 21st century include new footpaths, fencing, pedestrian gates and tree planting.

== Catton Hall ==
Catton hall is located on higher ground adjacent to the northern boundary. It was built by Charles Buckle as a country residence in c1780 and is listed with Historic England. It remained in private hands until 1948 when owner Desmond Buxton sold the hall and land to Norfolk County Council. The hall was used as a home for the elderly and was later sold and converted into apartments and remains closed to the public.

== Location ==
Today, the park is surrounded by housing estates and roads. Spixworth Road and Oak Lane form the eastern boundary, St Faiths Road the west, Church Street to the north while the south of the park is bounded by the A1042 road (Chartwell Road).
