= Kilkenny College =

Location
- Castlecomer Road; Kilkenny, County Kilkenny, R95 CF61; Ireland; 52.6674°N 7.2501°W

Information
- Type: Co-educational Day and Boarding School (Public)
- Motto: Comme Je Trouve (As I Find)
- Religious affiliation: Church of Ireland
- Established: 1538; 488 years ago
- Founder: Piers Butler, 8th Earl of Ormond
- Board of Governors: Aubrey Nuzum,
- Principal: Emma Raughter
- Staff: Approx 100
- Gender: Coeducational
- Age: 12 to 18
- Enrolment: ca. 920 (ca. 500 boarding)
- Houses: 4
- Colours: Red, Black
- Publication: The Swift Review
- Athletics: Rugby, hockey
- Website: http://www.kilkennycollege.ie

Kilkenny College is a Church of Ireland co-educational day and boarding secondary school located in Kilkenny, in the South-East of Ireland. It is the largest co-educational boarding school in Ireland. In 2013 it transferred to the state/public sector and no longer charges fees for schooling. The school's students are mainly Protestant (Church of Ireland), although it is open to other denominations.

The college motto Comme je trouve, which means "As I find" in French, comes from the family coat of arms of the Butlers, an aristocratic family in the area and former patrons of the school. It is intended to encourage grit, striving through adversity and taking life's challenges head on.

It was founded in 1538 to replace the School of the Vicars Choral, which had been founded in 1234. Piers Butler the Earl of Ormond located it in the city centre. It was moved to its current location on the outskirts of Kilkenny in 1985.

== History ==
Founded in 1538 by Piers Butler, 8th Earl of Ormond and his wife, Margaret, Kilkenny Grammar School as was then called was located to the west of the cathedral and sited beside the library of St Canice's Cathedral. The 1538 school replaced the older School of the Vicars Choral, which was founded in 1234. It was closed for a period in the 1650s (because of the English civil war that spilled over into Ireland), reopening as Kilkenny College in 1667 under the auspices of James Butler, 1st Duke of Ormond, following the Butler tradition of promoting education in the city. It soon became a famous school and so, in the 1780s, a new college was built on the same site overlooking the river Nore on John Street.

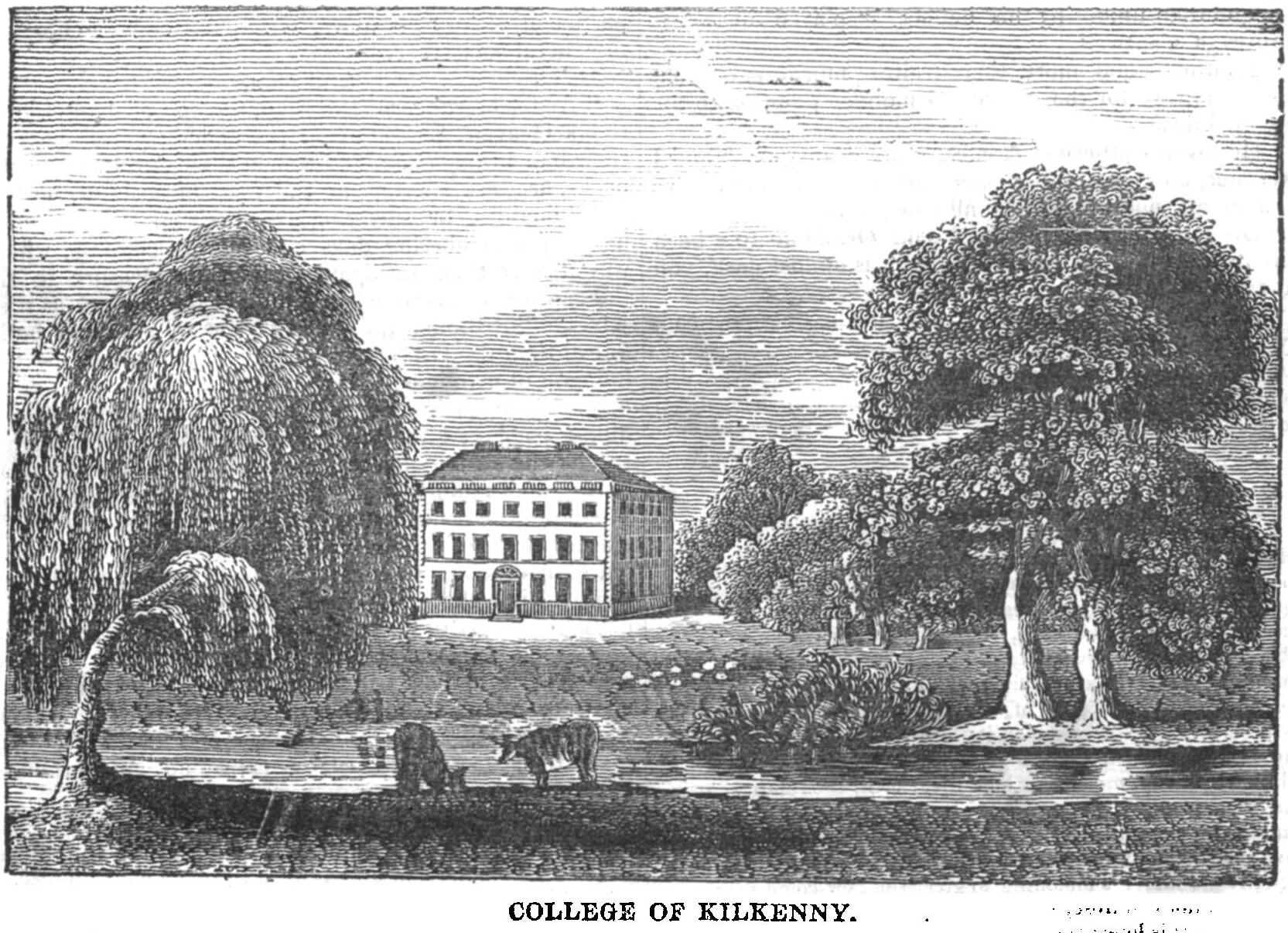
The College in 1835, The Dublin Penny Journal

In 1985 the college was relocated to the 63-acre (250,000 m^{2}) site at Celbridge House on the outskirts of the city, while the old school with its Georgian buildings and elegant facade, now known as County Hall, houses the offices of Kilkenny County Council within Kilkenny city centre.

At one time the college was termed a university and boasted a complement of three professors. In contrast, the end of the 19th century saw the college reduced to one pupil. The amalgamation with the nearby Pococke school was its saving. Twenty-nine headmasters of Kilkenny College are recorded, including such notable figures as Edward Jones, Bishop of St Asaph and John Mason Harden. In the 20th century there were four long-serving men: C.G. Shankey 1917 - 1952; Gilbert Colton 1953–1979; Samuel McClure 1979–1996; Canon Robert John Black 1996–2005. E. R. Dodds, the famous classicist and Michael Cusack also taught at the school.

During Gilbert Colton's time the school was amalgamated with the Collegiate School Celbridge in 1973 and Kilkenny College became co-educational. During Sam McClure's stewardship, the college moved to its new campus in 1985, relocating to the 63 acre (254,952m^{2}) site at Celbridge House on the outskirts of the city. Under Canon Robert John Black, Kilkenny College saw a significant phase of growth, development and expansion to the facilities and resources of the school during his nine years of leadership.

=== Coat of arms ===
Quarterly: 1st, or, a chief indented, azure; 2nd, gules, quarters: with three covered cups or; 3rd, argent, a lion rampant gules, on a chief of the second a swan, close, of the first, tween two annulets or; 4th, ermine, a saltier gules. Out of a ducal coronet or, a plume of five ostrich feathers, there from issuant a falcon, rising all argent. Dexter, a falcon, wings expanded argent, beaked and membered or; sinister, a male griffin argent, beaked, rayed, collared and chained gold or.

— Charles Mosley

The school's coat of arms is inherited from the Butler family. The escutcheon (shield) and crest in use today are almost identical to those formally described in Burke's Peerage. Butler's heraldric supporters (termed dexter and sinister) do not appear on the school's coat of arms. The Butler family motto ("Comme Je Trouve"), originally appearing on the crest, now appears below the school's shield.

The most widely used version of the school's coat of arms (the official one) has evolved with some changes. The silver quadrants of the escutcheon and the falcon itself have become white, the third quadrant's lion has emerged passant (walking past) while the fourth quadrant has lost its ermine (tail spots on fur). It's not clear if these small changes are attributable to artistic interpretation, simplified draughtsmanship (in the case of ermine) or possibly error (the lion). The modern coat of arms is supported by the letters "K" and "C" at the sides, and 1538, the year the college was founded at the top.

== Today ==
The current campus on the outskirts of the city comprises a complex of classrooms, dormitories, catering and dining facilities, it is set on a landscaped 50-acre (200,000 m^{2}) site. Today Kilkenny College attempts to serve a dual purpose role as the largest co-educational boarding school in Ireland and as the local school for a large number of day pupils from the city and surrounding area.

It is one of five schools in the country taking part in a pilot project on self-assessment and interchange in conjunction with 100 other European schools. The ethos of the school is one of a family community and an emphasis is placed on team sport in particular rugby and hockey.

In March 2013, the school announced that it would no longer be charging tuition fees for all students. Instead, only boarders and students who availed of extra-curricular activities would pay for accommodation, food, and other services.

== Notable past pupils ==
In its almost 500-year history, Kilkenny College has produced a number of notable past pupils, including:

Academia

- Richard Baldwin, D.D. (1668–1758), Provost, Trinity College Dublin (1717–1758).
- George Berkeley (1685–1753), philosopher and Bishop of Cloyne, after whom the university city of Berkeley, California is named.
- Abraham Colles, Prof. (1773–1843), elected President of the Royal College of Surgeons in Ireland (RCSI) at the age of 29. Colles gave his name to a seminal text on surgical anatomy and to a number of medical terms including Colles’ facia, Colles’ fracture and Colles’ law. Colles twice declined the offer of a knighthood.
- Andrew Fitzgerald, O.P (1763–1843) a native of Kilkenny, anti-tithe campaigner, he was a Catholic priest, a professor and President of Carlow College.
- John Hewitt Jellett (1817–1888), Provost of Trinity College, Dublin.
- William Henry Stanley Monck (1839–1915), astronomer and philosopher
- Thomas Prior (1681–1751), born in Rathdowney, County Laois, Prior was a lifetime friend of George Berkeley. Prior founded the Royal Dublin Society with Samuel Madden in 1731.
- Benjamin Williamson (1827–1916), mathematician, Fellow of Trinity College Dublin, Professor of Natural Philosophy at TCD

Arts and Media

- John Banim (1798–1842), Kilkenny-born novelist and playwright.
- Thomas Bibby (1799–1863), poet.
- William Congreve (1670–1729), English-born poet and playwright of the Restoration period (17th and 18th centuries).
- George Farquhar (1677–1707), a dramatist, who made notable contributions to Restoration comedy.
- Christopher Hewetson (1737–1798), neoclassical sculptor.
- Nick Vincent Murphy (born 1977), screenwriter.
- Jonathan Swift, D.D. (1668–1745), 17th century satirist and author of Gulliver's Travels, Dean of St. Patrick's, Dublin, and one of Kilkenny College's most distinguished alumni, so much so that the newest extension of classrooms is called the Jonathan Swift block in his honour.

Law and Politics

- The 1st Earl of Aldborough (1691–1777), peer and politician.
- Wellesley Bailey (1846–1937), founder of the international charity The Leprosy Mission
- John Beresford (1738–1805), statesman.
- Abraham Brewster (1796–1874), Lord Chancellor of Ireland.
- Edward Butler (1823–1879), Kilkenny-born barrister and politician. Butler served as editor of the Galway Vindcator during the Great Famine and was briefly imprisoned for his activities with the Young Ireland movement. As an emigrant to Australia, he served as a parliamentarian, Queen's Counsel and ultimately Leader of the Bar.
- Sir Thomas Butler, 6th Baronet (1735–1772), Member of the Irish House of Commons.
- The 1st Viscount Carleton (1739–1826), Chief Justice of the Irish Common Pleas
- David Alfred Chart, D.Litt. (1878-1990), archivist of State Papers at Dublin Castle and latterly Deputy Keeper of Public Records in Northern Ireland. Chart read many of his papers before the Statistical and Social Inquiry Society of Ireland and his book An Economic History of Ireland is still in print to this day.
- The 1st Earl of Clonmell (1739–1798), Lord Chief Justice of the King's Bench for Ireland.
- The 1st Earl of Enniskillen (1736–1803), Irish peer and politician.
- Warden Flood (1694–1764), Lord Chief Justice of Ireland and father of the statesman Henry Flood.
- The 2nd Earl of Glandore (1753–1815), Master of the Rolls in Ireland
- Price Hartstonge (1692–1743), Member of Parliament.
- The 4th Earl of Inchiquin (1700–1777), peer and politician.
- John Kinchela, LL.D. (1765–1845), acting Chief Justice of New South Wales, Australia.
- John Toler, 1st Earl of Norbury (1745–1831), Attorney General for Ireland.
- Hon.James O'Brien (1701–1771), politician.
- George Ponsonby (1773–1863), son of William, 1st Baron Ponsonby (of Imokilly), Bessborough, served as Junior Lord of the Treasury (1832–34). Ponsonby's sister (Mary Elizabeth, 1776–1861) is the fourth great-grandparent (eighth generation) of Prince William of Wales on his mother's side.
- Sir Gabriel Stokes (1849–1920), Indian civil servant and Governor of Madras
- The 1st Marquess of Waterford (1735–1800), Member of the Irish House of Commons and the Irish House of Lords.
- Thomas Westropp Bennett (1867–1962), Cathaoirleach (chairman) of the Irish Senate.

Military

- Admiral of the Fleet The 1st Earl Beatty (1871–1936). Lord Beatty served as First Sea Lord and Commander-in-Chief of the Grand Fleet.
- Tom Cruise Notable Top Gun graduate (2004).
- The 2nd Baron Longford (1743–1792), sailor in the Royal Navy.
- Major General Sir William Ponsonby (1772–1815), British Army Officer.

Religion

- Benjamin Cronyn (1802–1871), Bishop of Huron, Canada. In response to “unsound and un-Protestant” teaching at Trinity College Toronto, Cronyn established a “low church” theology school which subsequently became the founding college of the University of Western Ontario.
- The 1st Baron Decies (1743–1819), Archbishop of Tuam.
- Victor Gilbert Benjamin Griffin, D.D. (born 1924), Dean of St. Patrick's Dublin (1969–1991).
- John Hartstonge (1654–1717), Bishop of Ossory and Derry.
- Peter Lombard D.D. (1555 to 1625), Waterford-born scholar, appointed professor of theology at Université catholique de Louvain and latterly Archbishop of Armagh by Pope Clement VIII. At the behest of Pope Gregory XV, Lombard joined a Pontifical Commission investigating the affairs of Catholic missionaries in India. Barred from returning to Ireland by James I, Lombard resided in Rome until his death in 1625.
- William Connor Magee (1821–1891), Archbishop of York.
- Richard Ponsonby (1772–1853), Bishop of Derry and Raphoe.
- Luke Wadding (1588-1657) Waterford-born, maternal cousin of Archbishop of Armagh Peter Lombard, joined the Franciscan Order aged seventeen. Ordained to the priesthood at Viseu, he lectured divinity at University of Salamanca. Wadding penned Annnales-Minorum upon retirement and founded the Franciscan College of St Isidore's in Rome
- Hewitt Wilson (1924-2008) Eminent Anglican priest in the second half of the 20th century. Entered the RAF Chaplaincy Service, serving in a variety of locations before eventually becoming its Archdeacon (Chaplain-in-Chief) serving for seven years.

Sport

- Maeve Kyle (born 1928), Olympian and Irish Hockey International.
- Robin Copeland (born 1987), professional rugby player.
- Craig Ronaldson (born 1990), professional rugby player.
- Shane Delahunt (born 1994), professional rugby player.
- Foster Horan (born 1992), professional rugby player and Olympian.
- Jonathan Yates (born 1993), professional golfer.
- Nicola Fryday (born 1995), professional rugby player and captain of Ireland women's national rugby union team.

== Sources ==
- Clarke, D., 1951, "Thomas Prior, 1681-1751: Founder of the Royal Dublin Society", in Studies: An Irish Quarterly Review, 40(159), pp. 334–344.
- Darwin, K., 1961, "David Alfred Chart," in Journal of the British Records Association, 4(25).
- Dobbs, W.E.J., 1946, “A Supplement to the Entrance Register of Kilkenny School, 1684-1800,” in The Journal of the Royal Society of Antiquaries of Ireland, 76(3), pp133–142.
- Nairn, B., 1967, “Kinchela, John (1774?-1845)”, Australian Dictionary of Biography, Volume 2, Melbourne University Press, pp 51–52.
- Nairn, B., 1969, "Butler, Edward (1823-1879)", Australian Dictionary of Biography, Volume 3, Melbourne University Press, pp 312–315.
- Langtry, J., 1892, History of the Church in Eastern Canada and Newfoundland, New York: Society for Promoting Christian Knowledge.
- O'Sullivan, G., 2007, Speech by the President of RCSI at Summer Conferrings, University College Cork, 21 June 2007.
