= Lavaré =

- Commune
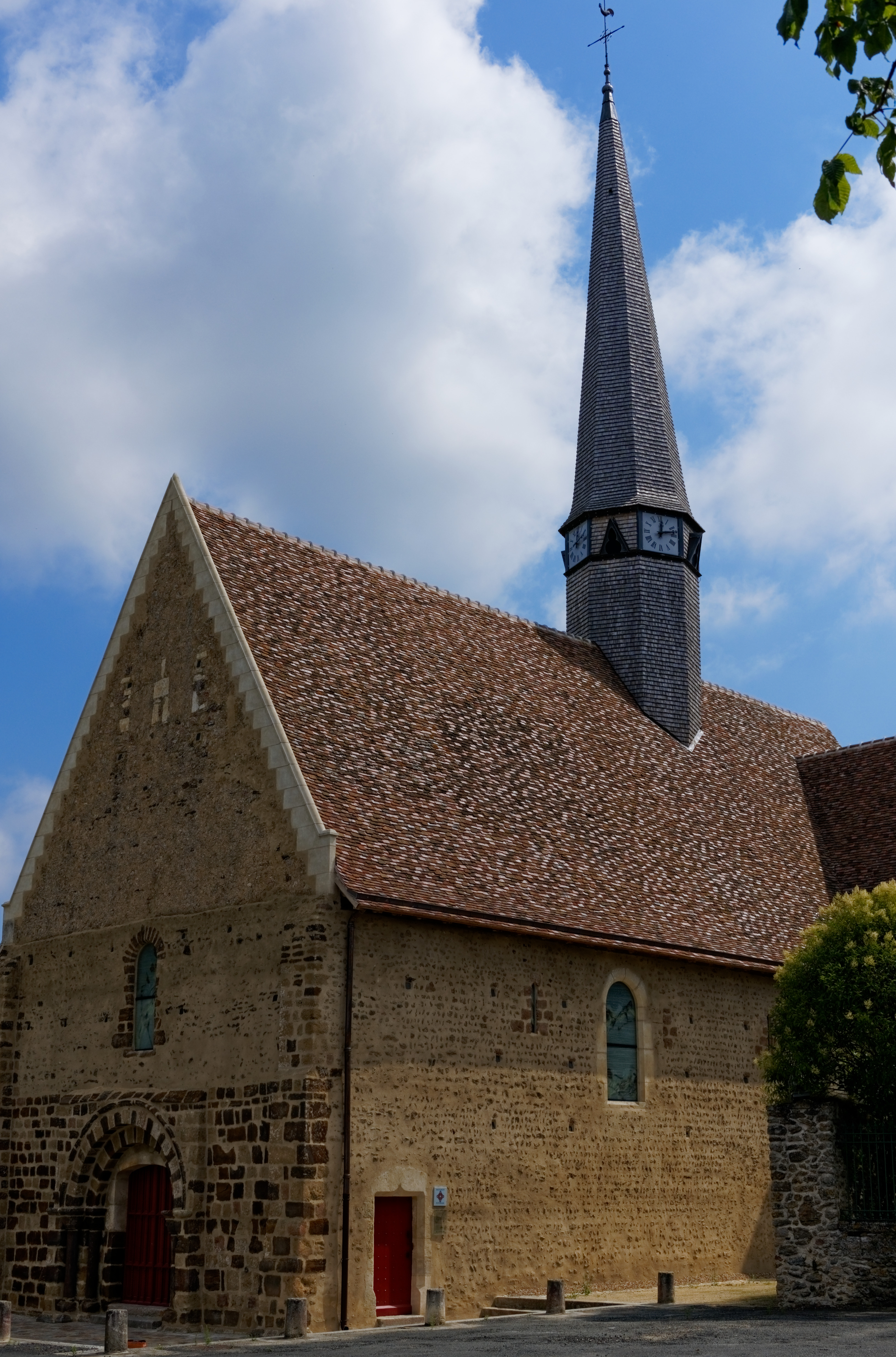
- The church of Saint-Pierre, after restoration
- Location of Lavaré
- Location within France Location within Pays de la Loire
- Coordinates: 48°03′10″N 0°38′41″E
- Country: France
- Region: Pays de la Loire
- Department: Sarthe
- Arrondissement: Mamers
- Canton: Saint-Calais
- Intercommunality: Vallées de la Braye et de l'Anille

Government
  - Mayor (2020–2026): Nicolas Massé
- Area^{1}: 22.88 km^{2} (8.83 sq mi)
- Highest elevation: 199 m (653 ft)
- Lowest elevation: 86 m (282 ft)
- Population (2023): 815
  - Density: 35.6/km^{2} (92.3/sq mi)
- Time zone: UTC+01:00 (CET)
  - Summer (DST): UTC+02:00 (CEST)
- INSEE/Postal code: 72158 /72390
- ^{1} French Land Register data, which excludes lakes, ponds, glaciers > 1 km^{2} (0.386 sq mi or 247 acres) and river estuaries.

Lavaré (French pronunciation: [lavaʁe]) is a commune in the Sarthe department in the region of Pays de la Loire in north-western France.

== Twin towns – sister cities ==
- Old Catton, England. Twinning association
- Wagenfeld, Germany

== See also ==
- Communes of the Sarthe department
