= Thomas Bibby =

Irish poet (1799–1863)

Thomas Bibby (1799–1863) was an Irish poet.

== Life ==
He was born at Kilkenny, studied at Kilkenny College, and then at Trinity College, Dublin, which he entered in 1814 on a scholarship At the age of thirteen, Bibby won a gold medal for science, and he subsequently became one of the best Greek students of his day. He graduated in 1816, and went on to lead a studious but secluded life in his native Kilkenny, developing eccentricities which suggested to many that he was insane.

He died on 7 January 1863, after a painful illness, at his house at St. Canice's Steps. His brother Samuel Hale Bibby, was a surgeon in Green Street, Grosvenor Square, London, and shared his literary taste, but was considered to be more conventional.

== Works ==
Bibby published two dramatic poems in blank verse, Gerald of Kildare (1854), and its sequel, Silken Thomas, or Saint Mary's Abbey (1859).

== See also ==
- Sale of books at Sotheby's
- Obituary and family history dating back to John Bibby, Portreeve of Irishtown in 1691

== Notes ==
Attribution

This article incorporates text from a publication now in the public domain: "Bibby, Thomas". Dictionary of National Biography. London: Smith, Elder & Co. 1885–1900.
