= Standish Hartstonge (Kilkenny City MP) =

Anglo-Irish lawyer and politician

Standish Hartstonge (1656–31 May 1704) was an Anglo-Irish lawyer and politician from Kilkenny city, who was MP for Kilkenny City in the Irish House of Commons from 1695 until his death.

He was born in Norfolk, a younger son of the eminent judge Sir Standish Hartstonge, 1st Baronet and his first wife Elizabeth Jermyn, daughter of Francis Jermyn (or Jermy) of Gunton Hall. His family moved to Ireland, where they already owned property, in the late 1660s. He entered King's Inns in 1681. His brother John Hartstonge became Church of Ireland bishop of Ossory in 1693. Through the bishop's influence, Standish was made Recorder of Kilkenny from 1694, and also served as Custos Rotulorum of County Tipperary under his father's patron the Duke of Ormond. An anonymous comic verse c.1700, namechecking various Dublin Castle courtiers of the Lord Lieutenant, suggests the ideal beau would be one who "like Hartstong loves". He died unmarried. Although his 1704 will and testament states that he was then living in Dublin and requested burial there in St. Audoen's Church, he was in fact interred by his brother in St Canice's Cathedral, Kilkenny.

He bequeathed his land at Talbot's Inch, just outside Kilkenny, to his brother John, disinheriting their nephew Sir Standish Hartstonge, 2nd Baronet, whose impulsive teenage marriage to Anne Price of Presteigne had caused a bitter family feud. They had also been on opposite sides in a family lawsuit over the terms of the elder Sir Standish's will, which disinherited young Standish in favour of his uncle Gwynne.
