= Lucy Hartstonge =

Irish heiress and philanthropist

- Born: Lucy Pery c. 1722; Limerick, Ireland
- Died: 20 March 1793; Limerick Ireland
- Resting place: Bruff, County Limerick, Ireland
- Spouse: Sir Henry Hartstonge, 3rd Baronet

Lucy Hartstonge (born Lucy Pery) was an Irish heiress and philanthropist who founded the first fever hospital in Ireland (located in the city of Limerick), in the late 18th century.

== Family ==
Lucy Pery was born c. 1722 into one of Limerick city's most politically influential families, the only daughter of the Rev. Stackpole Pery and Jane Twigge. Her maternal grandfather was William Twigg, Archdeacon of Limerick. She was the younger sister of Edmund Pery, 1st Viscount Pery and William Pery, 1st Baron Glentworth.

In 1751 she married Sir Henry Hartstonge, 3rd Baronet, also MP for Limerick, after whom the Limerick streets of Henry Street and Sir Harry's Mall are named; Hartstonge Street (now divided into Upper and Lower sections) is named for them both. The Hartstonges had no children, and the baronetcy died with Henry. She died on 20 March 1793 in Limerick City and interred in her husband's family vault in Bruff, County Limerick.

== Projects ==
In 1776, she erected a new church in Bruff, County Limerick.

=== Hospital ===
Independently wealthy, Lady Hartstonge purchased the site of the old St John's Barracks in 1780, and founded the Lock and Fever Hospital (now St. John's Hospital, Limerick), the city's first hospital, in an old guard-house, beginning with three wards opened in 1781. She persuaded wealthy friends to donate to the hospital project, and her husband agreed to act as treasurer; she worked in the hospital herself until her death in 1793.

In 1988, the Limerick Civic Trust erected a plaque detailing her involvement in the foundation of the hospital.
