= St. John's Hospital, Limerick =

Public hospital in Limerick, Ireland

St. John's Hospital
- Voluntary Public Hospital
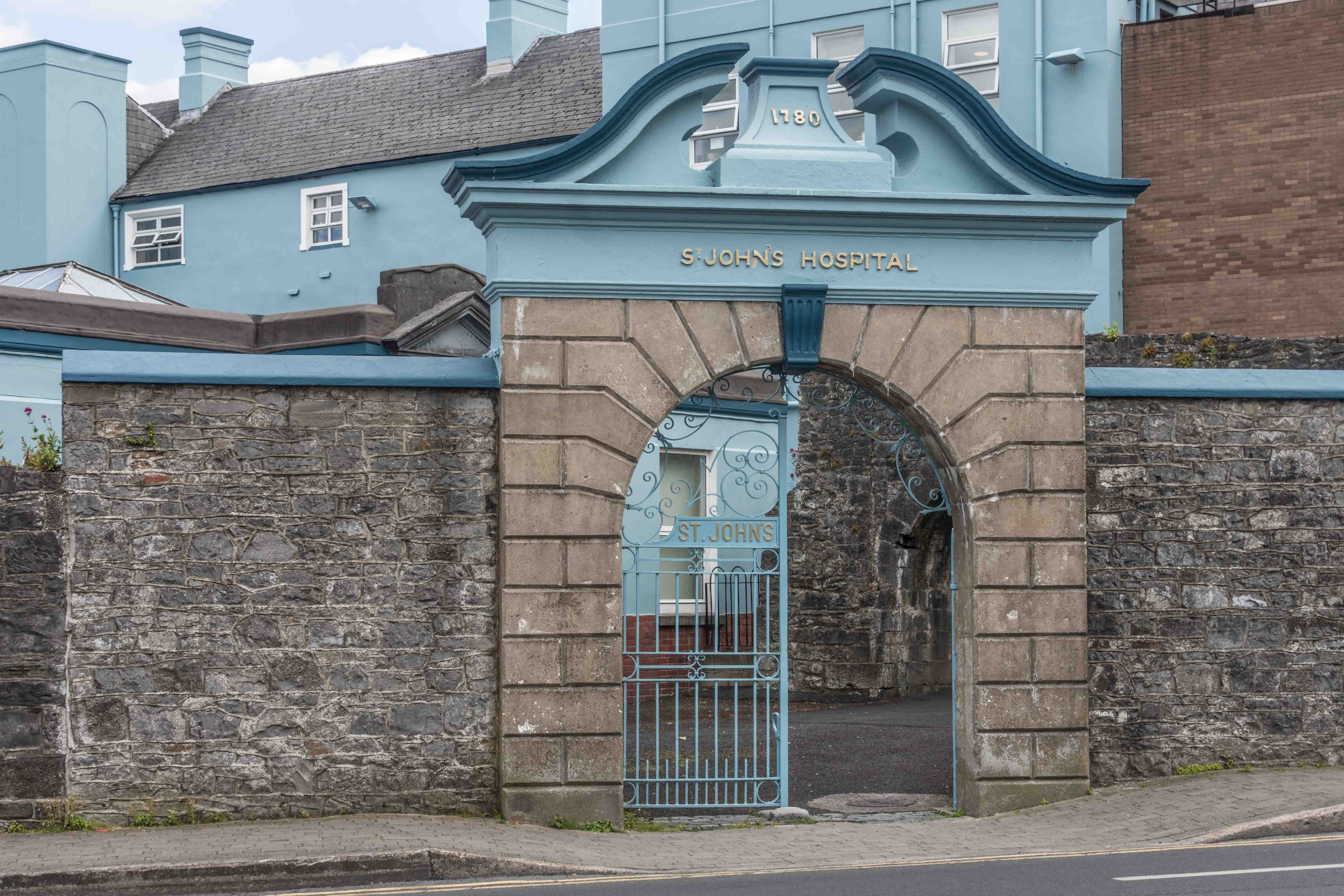
- Front entrance of St John's Hospital

- Shown in Ireland

Geography
- Location: Limerick, County Limerick, Ireland
- Coordinates: 52.66327°N 8.61689°W

Organisation
- Care system: HSE
- Type: General

Services
- Beds: 99

History
- Founded: 1781

Links
- Website: https://www.stjohnshospital.ie/ www.hse.ie/eng/services/list/3/acutehospitals/hospitals/ulh/hospitals/stjohns/

St. John's Hospital (Irish: Ospidéal Naomh Eoin) is an acute general voluntary hospital located in the city of Limerick, County Limerick, Ireland. St. John's Hospital is governed and managed independently by its own hospital board in accordance with its constitution. Although it is independently managed, St. John's Hospital is one of six hospitals that form UL Hospitals Group. It is near the city centre, close to St John's Cathedral.

== History ==
St. John's Hospital Limerick Act 1781
- Act of Parliament
- Parliament of Ireland
- Long title: An Act for extending the Provisions of an Act passed in this Kingdom in the sixth Year of the Reign of His present Majesty, entitled, "An Act for erecting and establishing publick Infirmaries or Hospitals in this Kingdom."
- Citation: 21 & 22 Geo. 3 (I). c. 13 (I)
- Territorial extent: Kingdom of Ireland

Dates
- Royal assent: 12 February 1782

Other legislation
- Amends: County Hospitals Act 1765

The hospital, founded by Lady Lucy Hartstonge, was built on the site of an old barracks and opened as the Fever Hospital of Saint John in 1781. The hospital was formally established by the St. John's Hospital Limerick Act 1781 (21 & 22 Geo. 3 (I). c. 13 (I)). The Sisters of the Little Company of Mary took over the management of the hospital in 1888.

The emergency department was replaced by a minor injuries unit in 2013.
