= Price Hartstonge =

Anglo-Irish politician

Price Hartstonge (1692–1744) was an Anglo-Irish politician who sat in the Irish House of Commons as MP for Charleville from 1727–44.

== Background ==
He was born at Presteigne in Radnorshire, the second and eldest surviving son of Sir Standish Hartstonge, 2nd Baronet and his wife Anne Price, daughter of a local judge. The Hartstonges, originally from Norfolk, had become substantial landowners in Ireland in the seventeenth century. Price's father Standish had been raised by his grandfather Sir Standish Hartstonge, 1st Baronet, Baron of the Exchequer in Ireland, who was then living in retirement in Hereford, but the marriage of Price's parents caused a bitter family feud, and in about 1695 young Standish took his family to live in Ireland. Price was educated at Kilkenny College and Trinity College, Dublin.

== Career ==
Standish had a long and successful career as a member of the Irish House of Commons and Price follows his father into Parliament, sitting for Charleville from 1727. Price died well before his father in February 1744.

== Family ==
Price married Alice Widenham, daughter, and co-heiress with her sister Mary Quin of Henry Widenham (died 1719) of Court Castle, Kildimo, County Limerick. She was a considerable heiress, who brought her husband a dowry of £6000. Her father also left her his lands at Kildimo, which included Court Castle and Dromore Castle.

They had at least four children including:

- Sir Henry Hartstonge, 3rd Baronet, upon whose death the title became extinct
- Mary, who married Henry Ormsby of Cloghan, County Mayo, and was the mother of
  - Mary Alice Pery (died 1850), who inherited the Hartstonge estates: she married Edmund Pery, 1st Earl of Limerick, and had eight children.
- Anne.

Alice's sister Mary Widenham married Valentine Quin of Adare; they were the grandparents of Valentine Richard Quin, 1st Earl of Dunraven and Mount-Earl.
