= Sir Standish Hartstonge, 1st Baronet =

English-born lawyer

Sir Standish Hartstonge, 1st Baronet (1627–August 1701) was an English-born lawyer who had a distinguished career as a judge in Ireland, but was twice removed from office. He was also a very substantial landowner in Ireland and England. His last years were marked by a bitter family dispute with his eldest grandson, who inherited the baronetcy, but not the family estates, which passed to the judge's youngest surviving son.

== Background and early career ==
He was born in Norfolk, the eldest son of Francis Hartstonge of Old Catton (which is now a suburb of Norwich). His mother was Elizabeth Standish, eldest daughter and co-heiress of Sir Thomas Standish of Sandon Chapel, Surrey and Bruff, County Limerick, and his wife and cousin Faith Upton, daughter of Hamon Upton. He inherited a considerable fortune from the Standish side of the family, including lands in County Clare.

In his later years, he put up a memorial at St. Peter's Church, Bruff, in honour of his grandfather Sir Thomas Standish, which gives some useful details of his family history. It was largely rebuilt by his grandson.

He entered Middle Temple in 1657 at a relatively late age, and decided to pursue a career in Ireland. He entered the King's Inn in Dublin in 1659 and built up a flourishing practice. He was elected to the Irish House of Commons as MP for Limerick City in 1661. He became Recorder of Limerick, and second justice of the provincial court of Munster in 1666. He was the last holder of that office, which was abolished in 1672.

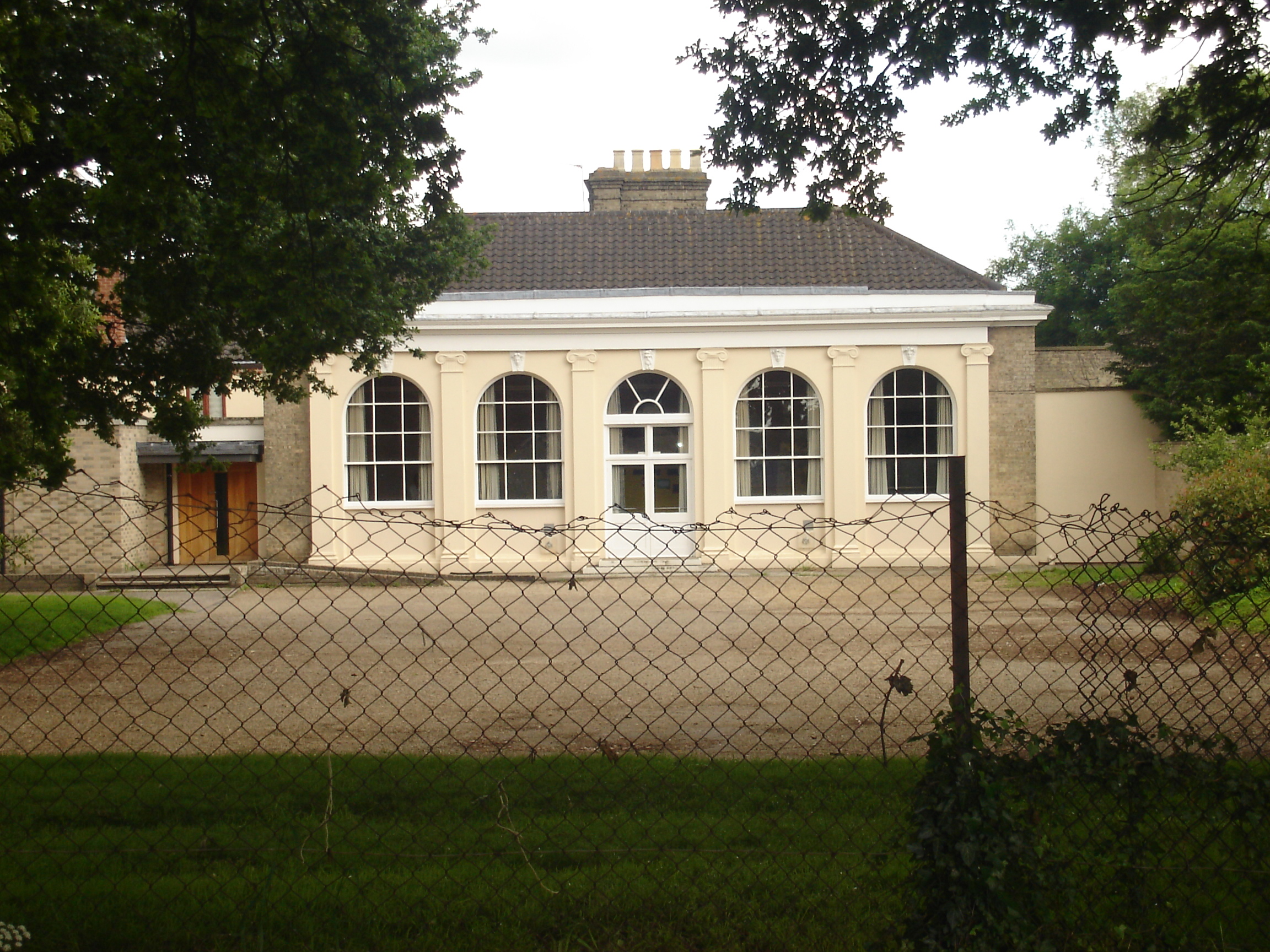
The Orangery, Old Catton, Norfolk- Sir Standish was a native of Old Catton

== Later career ==
He was appointed third Baron of the Court of Exchequer (Ireland) in 1680. The following year he was made a baronet, which was not an honour usually bestowed on an Irish judge at this time. It was said that the acquisition of the title was due to his independent wealth: in addition to the Bruff estates he acquired property in Hereford and a house at Oxmantown, just outside Dublin. He had a Dublin townhouse was at Little Green, off present-day Capel Street.

He was said to be in favour of a generous measure of religious toleration for Roman Catholics (which at that time often led to the accusation of being a secret Catholic oneself). Nonetheless, he was summarily removed from the Bench by the Catholic King James II in 1686, probably due to the hostility of the new Viceroy, Richard Talbot, 1st Earl of Tyrconnell, who was said to be jealous of his wealth and social standing. He settled the Limerick estates on his eldest son Francis and retired to Hereford.

After the Glorious Revolution of 1688, Hartstonge was anxious to resume his judicial career: he returned to Ireland and was appointed to his former office in 1691. However, despite his quarrel with the Catholic Viceroy in the previous reign, the old accusation that he was excessively tolerant of Roman Catholics was revived: he was removed from office for the second time in 1695, and retired once more to Hereford. His last years were troubled by quarrels with his eldest grandson and heir, who greatly offended him by marrying against his wishes. The turbulent career of his third wife's brother, Sir Rowland Gwynne, who was ultimately to die in a debtors' prison, was another source of worry to him. His last will is dated December 1699, and was the subject of a lawsuit in 1702. He is thought to have died in 1701.

== Family ==
Hartstonge married three times. His first wife, whom he married around 1650, was Elizabeth Jermyn (or Jermy) of Gunton Hall, Norfolk, daughter of Francis Jermyn and Alice Irby, daughter of Sir Anthony Irby and Alice Tash. They had 11 children, including Francis, Standish, John, Alice and Jane. According to the memorial stone he erected in honour of his grandfather, seven of his children, three sons and four daughters, were alive in 1676.

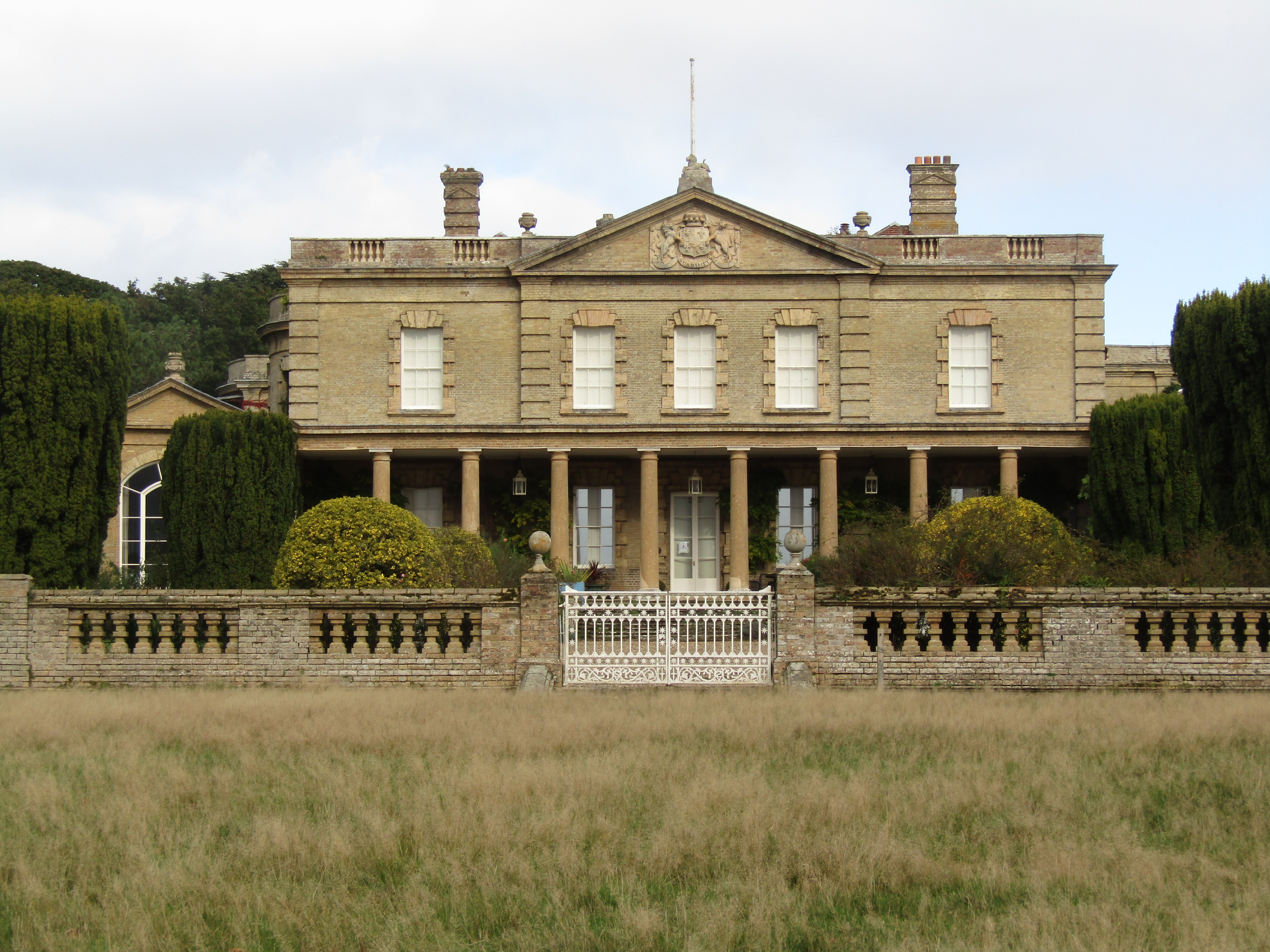
Gunton Hall, family home of Sir Standish's first wife Elizabeth Jermyn

Elizabeth died in 1663 and is commemorated by a stone plaque in St Mary's Cathedral, Limerick. His second wife was Anne Bramhall, daughter of John Bramhall, Archbishop of Armagh and Elinor Halley, who died in 1682. They had no children. His third wife was Joanna Gwynne Price, daughter of George Gwynne of Llanelwedd, Radnorshire, and his wife Sybil. Joanna was the widow of James Price and sister of Sir Rowland Gwynne, who was MP for Radnorshire, but died in a debtors' prison. She and Standish had one son, Gwynne (born 1685).

His eldest son Francis died in 1688 and the title passed to Francis's son Sir Standish Hartstonge, 2nd Baronet. His son Standish followed his father to the Irish Bar and was MP for Kilkenny City from 1695 until his death in 1704. A third son John was Bishop of Ossory 1693–1714, and Bishop of Derry 1714–1717. His daughter Alice married Anthony Maude, member of the Irish House of Commons for Cashel and High Sheriff of Tipperary, and was the mother of Sir Robert Maude, 1st Baronet and of Anne, who married Jerome Ryves, Dean of St Patrick's Cathedral Dublin. Her descendants acquired the titles Viscount Hawarden and Earl de Montalt. His daughter Jane married Arthur Chamberlain Brownlow, MP for County Armagh, and was the mother of William Brownlow, who like his father was MP for Armagh. Later generations of the Brownlow family acquired the title Baron Lurgan.

Sir Standish left the bulk of his estate to his youngest son, Gwynne, a decision which resulted in a long lawsuit between Gwynne and the younger Sir Standish, which eventually went in favour of Gwynne.

Baronetage of Ireland
New creation	Baronet (of Bruff, Limerick); 1681–1704	Succeeded by Standish Hartstonge
