= John Hartstonge =

English-born prelate

John Hartstonge or Hartstongue (1 December 1654 – 30 January 1717) was an English-born prelate of the Church of Ireland who became Bishop of Ossory and then Bishop of Derry.

== Family and education ==
He was born at Old Catton, Norfolk, on 1 December 1654, third son of Sir Standish Hartstonge, 1st Baronet and his first wife Elizabeth Jermyn, daughter of Francis Jermyn (or Jermy) of Gunton Hall. His father, who inherited substantial lands in County Limerick and County Clare, moved to Ireland in 1659, built up a successful legal practice, and became a Baron of the Irish Court of Exchequer.

John went to school at Charleville, and then attended Kilkenny College and entered Trinity College Dublin in 1672: he took his bachelor's degree in 1677. He then entered Gonville and Caius College, University of Cambridge, and took his master's degree in 1680. He spent a year at the University of Glasgow, then travelled abroad for a time before becoming a fellow of Gonville and Caius College.

== Career ==
He had a family connection with John Bramhall, Archbishop of Armagh, whose daughter was his stepmother; but of more benefit to his career was his friendship with the Dukes of Ormonde. He was family chaplain to James Butler, 1st Duke of Ormonde, and after the first Duke's death was reappointed to the same position by the second Duke, whom he even accompanied on military campaigns. He became Archdeacon of Limerick in 1684.

He was sufficiently prominent to be attainted for treason by the Dublin Parliament held in Dublin in 1689 by James II. After the victory of William III he was made, through Ormonde's influence, Bishop of Ossory in 1693. In 1704 he inherited the estate of his unmarried brother Standish, MP for Kilkenny at Talbot's Inch, and arranged his burial in St. Canice's Cathedral. In 1714 he became Bishop of Derry. His reaction to the downfall of his great patron Ormonde, who was accused of involvement in a Jacobite conspiracy and fled to France in 1715, is unknown.

He died in Dublin on 30 January 1717 and was buried in St. Andrew's Church, Dublin.

== Marriage ==
By his wife, Isabella (Belle) Danvers (or D'Anvers), daughter of Samuel Danvers and Beata Brydges and a Lady of the Bedchamber to Queen Anne, he had one daughter, Ann.

Belle Danvers was a bitter personal enemy of Sarah, Duchess of Marlborough, who described her as "not looking human".

Another enemy of Belle, Mary Cowper, portrayed her marriage caustically: "She (Belle) married an Irish bishop who hoped to be made an English Bishop by marrying one of the Queen's dressers, but, I don't know how it happened, he missed his aim, and got only one of the frightfullest, disagreeablest wives in the Kingdom".

In fact, the marriage had social advantages for the bishop, since Belle was the first cousin to James Brydges, 1st Duke of Chandos on her mother's side. Family letters show that the Hartstonges were on friendly terms with the Duke and Duchess of Chandos.

Belle Danvers is a minor character in the novel Shores of Darkness by Diana Norman.
