= Listed parks and gardens in the East of England =

The Register of Historic Parks and Gardens of Special Historic Interest in England, created in 1983, is administered by Historic England. It includes more than 1,600 sites, ranging from gardens of private houses, to cemeteries and public parks.

There are 224 registered parks and gardens in the East of England. 11 are listed at grade I, the highest grade, 58 at grade II*, the middle grade, and 155 at grade II, the lowest grade.

== Key ==
Grade	Criteria
I	Parks and gardens of exceptional interest, sometimes considered to be internationally important
II*	Particularly important parks and gardens of more than special interest
II	Parks and gardens of national importance and special interest

== Parks and gardens ==
=== Bedfordshire ===
Name	Grade	Location	Type	Completed (Note: The date given is the date used by Historic England as significant for the initial building or that of an important part in the structure's description.)	Grid ref. (Note: The grid reference is based on the British national grid reference system, sometimes known as OSGB36, used by the Ordnance Survey.) Geo-coordinates	Entry number (Note: The "List Entry Number" is a unique number assigned to each listed building and scheduled monument by Historic England.)	Image
The Alameda	II	Ampthill	Promenade	1827	TL0305537811	1431149	The Alameda
Ampthill Park	II	Millbrook	Landscape park	1772	TL 02717 38816	1000378	Ampthill Park
Battlesden House	II	Battlesden	Park and garden	19th century	SP9548329138	1000573	Battlesden House
Bedford Cemetery	II	Brickhill	Cemetery	1855	TL 05004 51312	1001332	Bedford Cemetery
Bedford Park	II	Bedford	Public park	1888	TL 05220 51079	1001331	Bedford Park More images
Chicksands Priory	II	Campton and Chicksands	Park and garden	1810s	TL 12259 39178	1000574	Chicksands Priory
Flitwick Manor	II	Flitwick	Park and garden	Early 19th century	TL 02961 33974	1000383	Flitwick Manor
The Hazells	II	Sandy	Park and garden	1792	TL 19024 49939	1000572	The Hazells
Hexton Manor	II	Shillington	Park and garden	Early 19th century	TL 11236 30621	1000910	Hexton Manor
Hinwick Hall	II	Podington	Park and garden	1910	SP 93434 62333	1000575	Hinwick Hall
Hinwick House	II	Podington	Park and garden	Late 18th century	SP 93669 61863	1000576	Hinwick House
Howard's House Garden	II	Cardington	Garden	1762	TL0865847999	1431093	Howard's House Garden
Ickwell Bury	II	Old Warden	Park and garden	19th century	TL 13947 45918	1000577	Ickwell Bury
Improvement Garden	II*	Farley Hill	Public park	1991	TL0864319661	1468798	Improvement Garden
Luton Hoo	II*	Hyde	Park and garden	Early 20th century	TL 10600 16727	1000578	Luton Hoo
Moggerhanger Park	II	Willington	Park and garden	1792	TL1346948695	1001369	Moggerhanger Park
Old Warden Park (including the Swiss Garden)	II*	Northill	Park and garden	1830s	TL1404544275	1000474	Old Warden Park (including the Swiss Garden)
Southill Park	II*	Shefford	Park and garden	1777	TL1380142570	1000579	Southill Park
Three Gables Garden	II	Biddenham	Garden	1900	TL0296750093	1430989	Three Gables Garden
Turvey House and Gardens	II	Turvey	Park and garden	Early 19th century	SP9387952947	1431122	Turvey House and Gardens More images
Wardown Park	II	Luton	Public park	1907	TL 08911 22835	1001445	Wardown Park More images
Westfield House Gardens	II	Oakley	Garden	1964	SP9953854040	1431906	Upload Photo
Whipsnade Tree Cathedral	II	Whipsnade	Memorial garden	1939	TL0081318165	1439326	Whipsnade Tree Cathedral
Woburn Abbey	I	Husborne Crawley	Park and garden	Early 19th century	SP 96448 33227	1000364	Woburn Abbey
Wrest Park	I	Gravenhurst	Park and garden	Early 18th century	TL0958935466	1000113	Wrest Park

=== Cambridgeshire ===
Name	Grade	Location	Type	Completed	Grid ref. Geo-coordinates	Entry number	Image
48 Storey's Way	II	Cambridge	Garden	1913	TL4358459534	1422759	48 Storey's Way
Abbots Ripton Hall	II	Abbots Ripton	Park and garden	1950s	TL 24234 77769	1000610	Abbots Ripton Hall
American Military Cemetery	I	Madingley	Cemetery	1956	TL 40507 59632	1001573	American Military Cemetery
Anglesey Abbey	II*	Lode	Garden	1966	TL 52816 61970	1000611	Anglesey Abbey
Bourn Hall	II	Bourn	Park and garden	1817	TL3140755623	1000613	Bourn Hall
Burghley House	II*	St Martin's Without	Park and garden	Early 20th century	TF 04601 05443	1000359	Burghley House
Cambridge University Botanic Garden	II*	Cambridge	Botanic garden	1846	TL 45535 57182	1000612	Cambridge University Botanic Garden
Childerley Hall	II*	Childerley	Park and garden	16th century	TL 35596 61553	1000614	Childerley Hall
Chippenham Park	II	Snailwell	Park and garden	19th century	TL 66509 68934	1000615	Chippenham Park
Christ's College	II	Cambridge	College grounds	Mid 19th century	TL 45153 58569	1000616	Christ's College
Clare College	II	Cambridge	College grounds	17th century	TL 44451 58441	1000617	Clare College
Croxton Park	II*	Croxton	Park and garden	Early 19th century	TL 25334 59495	1000491	Croxton Park
Dullingham House	II	Stetchworth	Park and garden	1810s	TL 62708 58062	1000618	Dullingham House
Emmanuel College	II*	Cambridge	College grounds	18th century	TL 45296 58333	1000619	Emmanuel College
Gamlingay	II	Gamlingay	Garden	1712	TL 22689 51970	1000620	Gamlingay
Hamerton	II	Hamerton and Steeple Gidding	Garden	Early 17th century	TL 13781 79493	1000621	Hamerton
Hatley Park	II	Hatley	Park and garden	Early 18th century	TL 27431 51003	1000622	Hatley Park
Hilton Maze	II	Hilton	1660	Maze	TL 29244 66220	1000623	Hilton Maze
Histon Road Cemetery	II*	Cambridge	Cemetery	1843	TL 44426 59638	1001569	Histon Road Cemetery
King's College	II*	Cambridge	College grounds	Early 19th century	TL 44531 58325	1000624	King's College
Leighton Bromswold	II	Leighton	Garden	Early 17th century	TL 11732 75131	1000625	Leighton Bromswold
Longstowe Hall	II*	Caxton	Park and garden	1910s	TL 30567 55715	1000626	Longstowe Hall
Madingley Hall	II	Madingley	Park and garden	1756	TL 39211 60559	1000627	Madingley Hall
Mill Road Cemetery	II	Cambridge	Cemetery	1848	TL 46135 58198	1001561	Mill Road Cemetery
Milton Hall	II*	Bretton	Park and garden	19th century	TL 14973 99775	1000628	Milton Hall
Pampisford Hall	II*	Pampisford	Park and garden	1840s	TL 50878 48429	1000321	Pampisford Hall
Pearl Centre Landscape	II	Peterborough	Office grounds	1992	TL1401096564	1462808	Upload Photo
Peckover House and Garden	II	Wisbech	Garden	Mid 19th century	TF 45796 09674	1000629	Peckover House and Garden
Peterborough Cathedral Precincts	II	Peterborough	19th century	Garden	TL 19416 98630	1001638	Peterborough Cathedral Precincts
Queen's College	II	Cambridge	College grounds	18th century	TL 44575 58106	1000630	Queen's College
Sawston Hall	II	Pampisford	Garden	Late 19th century	TL4889248982	1000631	Sawston Hall
St John's College	II*	Cambridge	College grounds	1770s	TL 44586 58798	1000632	St John's College
Swaffham Prior House	II	Swaffham Bulbeck	Park and garden	1880s	TL 56161 63947	1000396	Swaffham Prior House
Thorpe Hall	II*	Peterborough	Park and garden	1656	TL 17082 98521	1000139	Thorpe Hall
Trinity College	II	Cambridge	College grounds	Late 19th century	TL 44496 58599	1000633	Trinity College
Trinity Hall	II	Cambridge	College grounds	1830	TL 44635 58498	1000634	Trinity Hall
Wilbraham Temple	II	Great Wilbraham	Park and garden	Early 19th century	TL 55363 57910	1000397	Wilbraham Temple
Wimpole Hall	I	Orwell	Park and garden	1801	TL3352050909	1000635	Wimpole Hall

=== Essex ===
Name	Grade	Location	Type	Completed	Grid ref. Geo-coordinates	Entry number	Image
Audley End House	I	Wendens Ambo	Park and garden	1767	TL 52292 37889	1000312	Audley End House
Belchamp Hall	II	Belchamp Walter	Park and garden	1770s	TL 82548 40622	1000737	Belchamp Hall
Belhus Park	II	Aveley	Landscape park	1763	TQ5711981643	1000738	Belhus Park
Beth Chatto Gardens	II	Elmstead	Garden	1960	TM0688523756	1468784	Beth Chatto Gardens
Blake Hall	II	Bobbingworth	Park and garden	Late 18th century	TL 53961 05085	1000311	Blake Hall
Boreham House	II	Boreham	Garden	1770s	TL 74597 09101	1000354	Boreham House
Braxted Park	II*	Great Braxted	Park and garden	1750s	TL8509215999	1000455	Braxted Park
Bridge End Gardens	II*	Saffron Walden	Public park	1838	TL 53651 38757	1000238	Bridge End Gardens
Briggens House	II	Roydon	Park and garden	1908	TL 41181 11149	1001705	Briggens House
Clacton Seafront Gardens	II	Clacton-on-Sea	Public park	1921	TM 17502 14435	1001626	Clacton Seafront Gardens
Colchester Castle Park	II	Colchester	Public park	1896	TL 99818 25598	1000208	Colchester Castle Park
Coopersale House	II	Epping	Park and garden	Mid 18th century	TL4725702070	1001485	Coopersale House
Copped Hall	II*	Waltham Abbey	Park and garden	Late 19th century	TL4287700910	1000384	Copped Hall
Danbury Park	II	Sandon	Park and garden	Mid 19th century	TL 76626 04984	1000739	Danbury Park More images
Down Hall	II	Matching	Park and garden	1870s	TL 51946 13079	1000740	Down Hall
Easton Lodge	II	Little Easton	Garden	1902	TL 59497 23974	1001484	Easton Lodge
Faulkbourne Hall	II	Witham	Park and garden	Late 19th century	TL 80382 16480	1000341	Faulkbourne Hall
Gibberd Garden	II	Sheering	Garden	1984	TL 48362 12564	1001299	Gibberd Garden
Gosfield Hall	II	Gosfield	Park and garden	Mid 19th century	TL7676829599	1000313	Gosfield Hall
Harlow Town Park	II	Harlow	Public park	1957	TL4508310855	1468217	Harlow Town Park
Hatfield Peverel Priory	II	Hatfield Peverel	Park and garden	1765	TL 79604 10910	1000206	Hatfield Peverel Priory
Hill Hall	II	Theydon Mount	Park and garden	1909	TQ4866699477	1000315	Hill Hall
Hylands House	II*	Chelmsford	Public park	Late 19th century	TL 68438 04206	1000197	Hylands House
Langleys	II	Great Waltham	Park and garden	Late 19th century	TL 69946 13586	1000241	Langleys
Layer Marney Tower	II	Layer Marney	Park and garden	1910	TL 92836 17538	1000209	Layer Marney Tower
Quendon Hall	II	Quendon and Rickling	Park and garden	17th century	TL 51682 31688	1000742	Quendon Hall
Riffhams	II	Danbury	Park and garden	1815	TL 77181 06038	1000239	Riffhams
Saffron Walden Maze	II	Saffron Walden	Maze	Mediaeval	TL 54278 38558	1000741	Saffron Walden Maze
Saling Grove	II	Great Saling	Park and garden	1790	TL7032425089	1000743	Saling Grove
Saling Hall	II	Great Saling	Garden	Late 17th century	TL 69945 25933	1000387	Saling Hall
Shortgrove Hall	II	Saffron Walden	Park and garden	1770s	TL 52609 35391	1000744	Upload Photo
Spains Hall	II*	Finchingfield	Park and garden	Early 19th century	TL 68011 33827	1000240	Spains Hall
St Osyth's Priory	II	St Osyth	Park and garden	19th century	TM 11838 16414	1000237	St Osyth's Priory
Terling Place	II	Terling	Park and garden	Early 19th century	TL 77627 13992	1000745	Terling Place
Thorndon Hall	II*	Herongate and Ingrave	Park and garden	1772	TQ6097691816	1000314	Thorndon Hall
Thorpe Hall	II	Thorpe-le-Soken	Garden	Early 20th century	TM 18224 21772	1000521	Thorpe Hall
Warley Place	II	Brentwood	Garden	1935	TQ 58371 90979	1000746	Warley Place
Weald Country Park	II	Brentwood	Public park	Early 18th century	TQ5664894667	1000747	Weald Country Park
Wivenhoe Park	II	Wivenhoe	Park and garden	1780	TM 03226 24103	1000371	Wivenhoe Park

=== Hertfordshire ===
Name	Grade	Location	Type	Completed	Grid ref. Geo-coordinates	Entry number	Image
Aldenham House	II	Elstree and Borehamwood	Arboretum	Early 20th century	TQ 17013 96600	1000902	Aldenham House
Amwell Grove and Amwell Pool	II	Great Amwell	Garden	Early 19th century	TL 37123 12579	1000903	Amwell Grove and Amwell Pool
Amwell House Gardens, including Scott's Grotto and Gazebo	II*	Ware	Garden	1764	TL 35675 13830	1000918	Amwell House Gardens, including Scott's Grotto and Gazebo
Ashridge	II*	Nettleden with Potten End	Park and garden	1830s	SP9939112329	1000330	Ashridge
Ashwell Bury	II	Ashwell	Garden	1908	TL 26549 39995	1000904	Ashwell Bury
Ayot Park	II	Kimpton	Park and garden	Late 18th century	TL 19815 17186	1000905	Ayot Park
Balls Park	II	Hertford	Park and garden	Early 18th century	TL 33635 11947	1000523	Balls Park
Bayfordbury	II	Bayford	Park and garden	19th century	TL3129510134	1000906	Bayfordbury
Benington Lordship	II	Benington	Park and garden	1900s	TL2928923534	1000907	Benington Lordship
Briggens	II	Stanstead Abbots	Park and garden	1908	TL 41181 11149	1001705	Upload Photo
Broadway	II	Letchworth Garden City	Public square	1914	TL 21566 32074	1000908	Broadway More images
Brocket Hall	II	Hatfield	Park and garden	1770	TL 21398 13021	1000540	Brocket Hall
Cassiobury Park	II	Sarratt	Public park	1930s	TQ 08685 97453	1000219	Cassiobury Park
Cell Park	II	Markyate	Park and garden	1910	TL0556617405	1000915	Cell Park
Cokenach	II	Barkway	Park and garden	Early 18th century	TL 39359 36211	1000909	Cokenach
Fanhams Hall	II	Wareside	Garden	1905	TL 37058 15667	1000172	Fanhams Hall
Garden House	II*	Cottered	Park and garden	1920s	TL 31546 29029	1000558	Garden House
Gobions	II	North Mymms	Park and garden	Early 19th century	TL 25403 03469	1000495	Gobions
Goldings	II	Hertford	Park and garden	1870s	TL 30925 14075	1001380	Goldings
Gorhambury	II	St Michael	Park and garden	1820s	TL 12324 07297	1000417	Gorhambury
Hanbury Manor	II	Ware	Park and garden	19th century	TL3511016316	1000220	Hanbury Manor
Hatfield House	I	Hatfield	Park and garden	Early 17th century	TL 24018 07769	1000343	Hatfield House
Hemel Water Gardens	II	Hemel Hempstead	Public park	1959	TL 05409 06615	1001710	Hemel Water Gardens
Hexton Manor	II	Hexton	Park and garden	19th century	TL 11236 30621	1000910	Hexton Manor
Homewood	II	Knebworth	Garden	1901	TL 23844 19858	1000911	Homewood
The Hoo	II	Kimpton	Park and garden	1762	TL1887020139	1000912	The Hoo
Howard Park and Gardens	II	Letchworth	Public park	1911	TL 22150 32577	1000913	Howard Park and Gardens
Julians	II	Rushden	Park and garden	1939	TL3036432291	1000914	Julians
Knebworth	II*	Codicote	Park and garden	Mid 19th century	TL 22786 20802	1000255	Knebworth
Lululaund Rose Garden	II	Bushey	Garden	Early 20th century	TQ 13532 95196	1001649	Lululaund Rose Garden
Moor Park	II*	Batchworth	Park and garden	1830	TQ 07336 93265	1000251	Moor Park
Napsbury Park	II	London Colney	Hospital grounds	1902	TL 16686 04133	1001400	Napsbury Park
Panshanger	II*	Hertford	Park and garden	1799	TL 29191 12780	1000916	Panshanger
Pishiobury	II	Sawbridgeworth	Park and garden	1783	TL4775414024	1000217	Pishiobury
Putteridge Bury	II	Offley	Park and garden	1911	TL 11935 24856	1000917	Putteridge Bury
Stanstead Bury	II	Stanstead Abbots	Park and garden	Late 16th century	TL 40314 11249	1000316	Stanstead Bury
St Paul's Walden Bury	I	St Paul's Walden	Park and garden	Early 18th century	TL1877621853	1000150	St Paul's Walden Bury
Temple Dinsley	II*	Preston	Park and garden	1911	TL 18420 24903	1000919	Temple Dinsley
Tewin Water	II	Welwyn	Park and garden	Late 18th century	TL 25595 14602	1000920	Tewin Water
Tring Park	II	Tring	Park and garden	Late 17th century	SP9277210619	1000218	Tring Park
Wall Hall	II	Aldenham	Park and garden	1803	TQ1347599444	1001455	Wall Hall
Woodhall Park	II*	Sacombe	Park and garden	Mid 19th century	TL 31671 18545	1000317	Woodhall Park
Wormleybury	II	Wormley	Park and garden	1770s	TL3540805714	1000252	Wormleybury
Wrotham Park	II	Potters Bar	Park and garden	1820s	TQ2448998979	1000254	Wrotham Park
Youngsbury	II*	Thundridge	Park and garden	1760s	TL3649118069	1000253	Youngsbury

=== Norfolk ===
Name	Grade	Location	Type	Completed	Grid ref. Geo-coordinates	Entry number	Image
Barningham Hall	II	Matlask	Park and garden	Early 19th century	TG 14790 35534	1001002	Barningham Hall
Beeston Hall	II	Ashmanhaugh	Park and garden	1778	TG3329121903	1000551	Beeston Hall
Blickling Hall	II*	Oulton	Park and garden	1730	TG1719129366	1000154	Blickling Hall
Breccles Hall	II	Stow Bedon	Garden	1910s	TL9627894454	1001003	Breccles Hall
Catton Hall	II*	Old Catton	Park and garden	1788	TG2291311811	1000269	Catton Hall
Chapelfield Gardens	II	Norwich	Public park	1867	TG 22583 08375	1001645	Chapelfield Gardens
City Cemetery	II	Norwich	Cemetery	1856	TG 20460 08708	1001560	City Cemetery
Crown Point	II	Trowse with Newton	Park and garden	Mid 19th century	TG 25689 07372	1001480	Crown Point
Ditchingham Hall	II	Ditchingham	Park and garden	Mid 18th century	TM 32142 92780	1000225	Ditchingham Hall
Earlham Hall	II	Norwich	Park and garden	Late 18th century	TG1908207907	1471383	Earlham Hall
Eaton Park	II*	Norwich	Public park	1928	TG 20578 07454	1001282	Eaton Park
Elmham House	II	North Elmham	Park and garden	Mid 18th century	TF 97943 21478	1001004	Elmham House
Felbrigg Hall	II*	Felbrigg	Park and garden	18th century	TG 19583 38051	1000185	Felbrigg Hall
Gunton Hall	II*	Antingham	Park and garden	Mid 19th century	TG 23168 33924	1000331	Gunton Hall
Hanworth Hall	II	Hanworth	Park and garden	1789	TG 19662 35121	1001005	Hanworth Hall
Happisburgh Manor	II	Happisburgh	Garden	1900	TG 38132 31010	1001460	Happisburgh Manor
Heigham Park	II	Norwich	Public park	1924	TG 21285 08111	1001347	Heigham Park
Heydon Hall	II*	Heydon	Park and garden	Early 18th century	TG1245227371	1000187	Heydon Hall
Holkham Hall	I	Burnham Thorpe	Park and garden	1750s	TF8727542293	1000461	Holkham Hall
Honing Hall	II*	Honing	Park and garden	1792	TG3263028684	1000362	Honing Hall
Houghton Hall	I	Harpley	Park and garden	Early 18th century	TF7763929329	1000462	Houghton Hall
Hunstanton Hall	II	Old Hunstanton	Park and garden	16th century	TF 69483 41122	1001006	Hunstanton Hall
Intwood Hall	II*	Keswick and Intwood	Park and garden	16th century	TG 19424 04033	1000320	Intwood Hall
Ketts Castle Villa	II	Thorpe Hamlet	Garden	1857	TG2426309042	1470948	Ketts Castle Villa
Kimberley Hall	II*	Wymondham	Park and garden	1778	TG0835304751	1001007	Kimberley Hall
Langley Hall	II	Carleton St Peter	Park and garden	1765	TG3476601438	1001008	Langley Hall
Lexham Hall	II	Litcham	Park and garden	18th century	TF8670317531	1000268	Lexham Hall
Lynford Hall	II	Lynford	Park and garden	1860s	TL8209593938	1000224	Lynford Hall
Mannington Hall	II	Itteringham	Garden	15th century	TG 13754 32076	1001009	Mannington Hall
Melton Constable Hall	II*	Melton Constable	Park and garden	Mid 19th century	TG 02997 31941	1000533	Melton Constable Hall
Mile Cross Gardens	II*	Norwich	Public park	1929	TG 21833 11310	1001345	Mile Cross Gardens
Narford Hall	II	Narford	Park and garden	Late 18th century	TF 76605 12832	1000337	Narford Hall
Oxburgh Hall	II	Foulden	Park and garden	17th century	TF7407100978	1001010	Oxburgh Hall
Pickenham Hall	II	South Pickenham	Park and garden	1905	TF 85371 04168	1001011	Pickenham Hall
Plantation Garden	II	Norwich	Garden	1890s	TG 22214 08535	1001012	Plantation Garden More images
The Pleasaunce	II	Overstrand	Garden	1930	TG 24716 40910	1001013	The Pleasaunce
Rainthorpe Hall	II	Newton Flotman	Park and garden	19th century	TM 20255 97315	1000292	Rainthorpe Hall
Raveningham Hall	II*	Raveningham	Park and garden	Early 20th century	TM 39896 96401	1001014	Raveningham Hall
Raynham Hall	II	Raynham	Park and garden	Early 18th century	TF 88529 26084	1001015	Raynham Hall
Rosary Cemetery	II*	Thorpe Hamlet	Cemetery	1819	TG 24430 08450	1001568	Rosary Cemetery
Salle Park	II	Salle	Park and garden	Mid 18th century	TG1146524896	1001016	Salle Park More images
Sandringham House	II*	Sandringham	Park and garden	1870s	TF6954128394	1001017	Sandringham House
Sennowe Hall	II	Gateley	Park and garden	1907	TF 98147 25600	1001018	Sennowe Hall
Shadwell Court	II	Brettenham	Park and garden	Mid 19th century	TL 91955 82522	1001019	Shadwell Court
Sheringham Hall	II*	West Beckham	Park and garden	1812	TG1355042222	1001020	Sheringham Hall
Stiffkey Old Hall	II	Stiffkey	Park and garden	1594	TF 97419 42954	1001021	Stiffkey Old Hall
Stradsett Hall	II	Stradsett	Park and garden	1813	TF 66554 06171	1001263	Stradsett Hall
Venetian Waterways	II	Great Yarmouth	Public park	1928	TG 53174 08650	1001618	Venetian Waterways
Voewood	II*	High Kelling	Garden	1905	TG 09881 39819	1001428	Voewood
The Walks	II	King's Lynn	Promenade	1725	TF 62444 19445	1001374	The Walks
Waterloo Park	II*	Norwich	Public park	1933	TG 22604 10317	1001348	Waterloo Park
Wensum Park	II	Norwich	Public park	1925	TG 22418 09856	1001346	Wensum Park
Wolterton Hall	II*	Wickmere	Park and garden	1729	TG1670931722	1001022	Wolterton Hall

=== Suffolk ===
Name	Grade	Location	Type	Completed	Grid ref. Geo-coordinates	Entry number	Image
Bury St Edmunds Abbey	II	Bury St Edmunds	Public park	1831	TL 85709 64162	1001493	Bury St Edmunds Abbey
Bawdsey Manor	II	Bawdsey	Garden	1909	TM 33813 38164	1001465	Bawdsey Manor
Belle Vue Park	II	Lowestoft	Public park	1874	TM 54986 94451	1001621	Belle Vue Park
Campsey Ashe Park	II*	Tunstall	Park and garden	17th century	TM3429855595	1000368	Campsey Ashe Park
Chantry Park	II	Ipswich	Public park	1928	TM1381144049	1000271	Chantry Park
Chilton Hall	II	Chilton	Garden	Early 17th century	TL8888442765	1000226	Chilton Hall
Christchurch Mansion	II	Ipswich	Public park	1895	TM 16419 45285	1000227	Christchurch Mansion
Cliff Gardens and Town Hall Garden	II	Felixstowe	Public park	1919	TM 30184 34295	1001220	Cliff Gardens and Town Hall Garden
Culford Park	II	Culford	Park and garden	Early 19th century	TL8283870738	1001363	Culford Park
Euston Hall	II*	Euston	Park and garden	17th century	TL 90660 78516	1000171	Euston Hall
Glemham Hall	II	Stratford St Andrew	Park and garden	Early 18th century	TM3426659577	1001461	Glemham Hall
Helmingham Hall	I	Helmingham	Park and garden	Mid 18th century	TM 18220 57658	1000270	Helmingham Hall
Henham Park	II	Blythburgh	1863	Park and garden	TM 45400 77720	1000557	Henham Park
Heveningham Hall	II*	Sibton	Park and garden	1782	TM3531273124	1000494	Heveningham Hall
Ickworth House	II*	Chevington	Park and garden	1796	TL8116961556	1000186	Ickworth House
Kentwell Hall	II*	Long Melford	Park and garden	Late 18th century	TL 86410 47711	1001169	Kentwell Hall
Melford Hall	II*	Long Melford	Park and garden	16th century	TL8675746317	1000228	Melford Hall
Old and New Cemetery	II*	Ipswich	Cemetery	1855	TM 17425 45539	1001572	Old and New Cemetery
Shrubland Hall	I	Coddenham	Park and garden	Early 19th century	TM1181653099	1000155	Shrubland Hall
Somerleyton Hall	II*	Somerleyton	Park and garden	1840s	TM 49230 97685	1000188	Somerleyton Hall
Tendring Hall Park	II	Stoke-by-Nayland	Park and garden	1791	TL9900635712	1000406	Tendring Hall Park
Trinity Hospital	II	Long Melford	Garden	1573	TL 86539 46677	1001170	Trinity Hospital
Woodbridge Cemetery	II	Woodbridge	Cemetery	1856	TM 26520 48751	1001652	Woodbridge Cemetery
