= Eaton Park Miniature Railway =

Miniature railway in Norwich, Norfolk, England

Eaton Park
- Coordinates: 52°37′12″N 1°15′26″E
- Opening date: May 1960

Ride statistics
- Theme: Ridable miniature railway

The Eaton Park Miniature Railway (EPMR) is situated in Eaton Park, in Norwich, Norfolk.

Construction began in 1957 and the 365-foot (111 m) loop of elevated 3 1/2 in (89 mm) and 5 in (127 mm) gauge track opened in May 1960, with public being carried on Summer Sundays. In the 1970s the line was extended to 955 feet (291 m). In 2004 a second ground level line, of mixed 5 in (127 mm) and 7 1/4 in (184 mm) gauge, was constructed, and there is now over 1 kilometre (0.62 mi) of track on the site. In February 2013 work started on a tunnel, designed to also serve as a secure trolley shed.
