= Herbaceous border =

Collection of plants arranged closely together in a garden

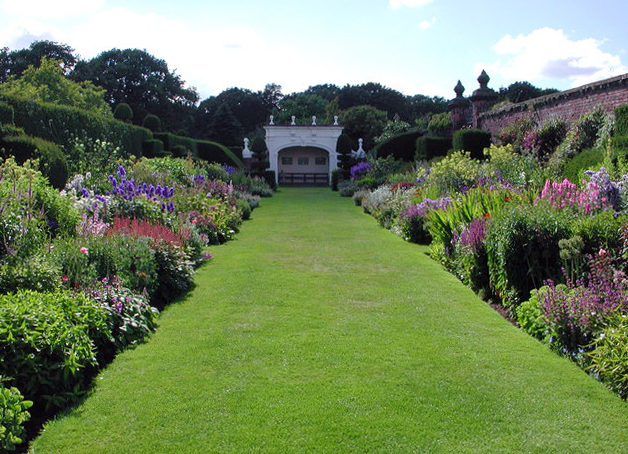
Herbaceous border at Arley Hall

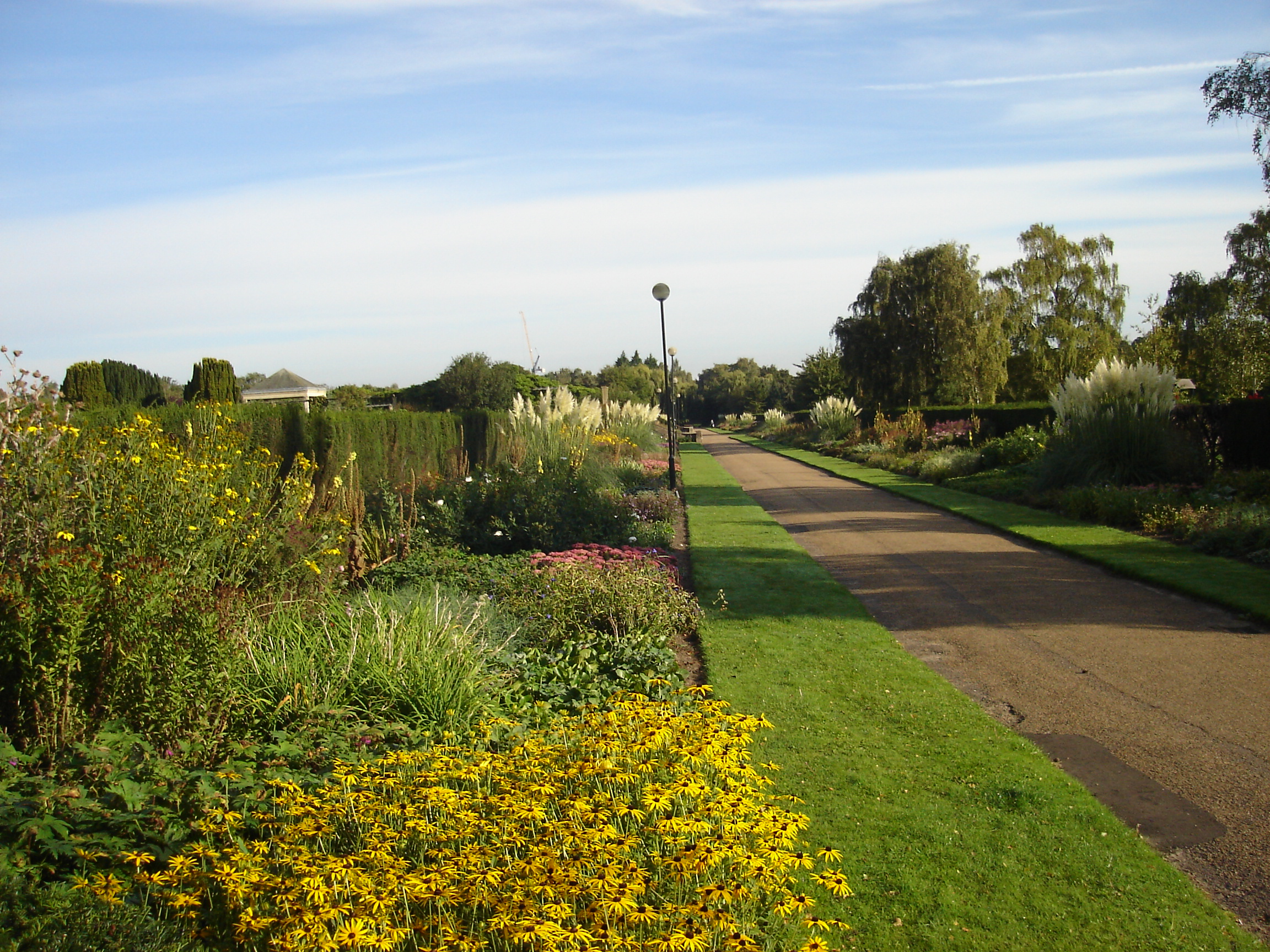
Waterloo Park, Norwich

A herbaceous border is a collection of perennial herbaceous plants (plants that live for more than two years and are soft-stemmed and non-woody) arranged closely together, usually to create a dramatic effect through colour, shape or large scale. The term herbaceous border is mostly in use in the United Kingdom and the Commonwealth. In North America, the term perennial border is normally used.

An early reference to the term occurs in The Gardener's Magazine on 1 June 1831 in a list of Plants for Summer and Autumn. Herbaceous borders as they are known today were first popularly used in gardens in the Victorian era. Hybridization and new imported plant species revolutionized the form of British gardens in the 18th and 19th centuries. In addition, the works of Gertrude Jekyll, a British 20th-century garden designer and prolific writer, popularized the use of the herbaceous border through a revival of the British cottage garden.

Maintaining the herbaceous border is work-intensive, as the perennials have to be dug up every 3–4 years and divided to keep the bed clean-looking and prevent overgrowth of the plants. In World War I this type of border became less popular in Britain as there was a shortage of labour to keep the gardens maintained. However, there are still some celebrated examples in British gardens. According to the Guinness Book of Records, the world's longest herbaceous border, at 215 metres (705 ft), is at Dirleton Castle, East Lothian, Scotland.
