= Turvey House and Gardens =

Country house in Turvey, Bedfordshire, England

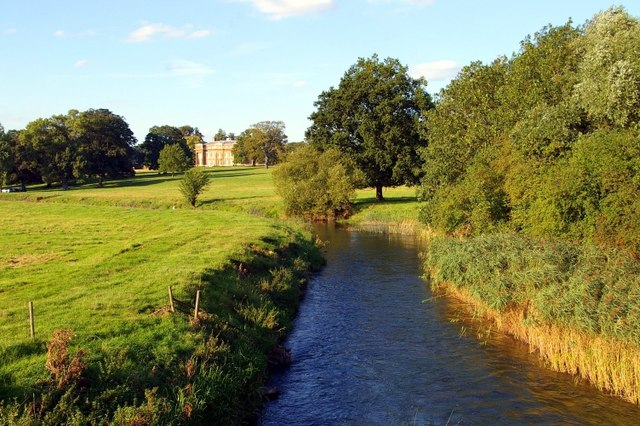

- Location within Bedfordshire
- 52°9′55″N 0°37′44″W
- Location: Turvey, Bedfordshire
- OS grid reference: SP 939 528

Site notes
- Area: 150 acres (61 ha)
- Website: www.turveyhouse.co.uk

National Register of Historic Parks and Gardens
- Designated: 29 November 2016
- Reference no.: 1431122

Listed Building – Grade I
- Designated: 7 May 1952
- Reference no.: 1039600

Turvey House and Gardens are a country house, gardens and parkland, situated by the village of Turvey in Bedfordshire, England. The gardens and parkland are listed Grade II in Historic England's Register of Parks and Gardens. and the house is a Grade I listed building. The house is a venue for weddings, events and location shoots.

== History ==
The Turvey Estate was bought in 1786 from Charles Henry Mordaunt, Fifth Earl of Peterborough, by Charles Higgins, Sheriff of London in that year. John Higgins, a cousin of Charles Higgins, acquired part of the estate, and in the 1790s he built Turvey House. The house was likely designed by the architect, John Wing of Bedford.

On his death in 1813, the estate was inherited by his eldest son Thomas Charles Higgins, High Sheriff of Bedfordshire in 1823. During the period from then until his death in 1865 there were many changes to the estate: the house was enlarged with an upper storey added in the 1830s, and modifications to the parkland included rerouting of driveways.

The Higgins family name remained associated with the estate; in 1939 Prunella Higgins married Lieutenant Colonel Sir Hanmer Hanbury, and the current custodians are Charles (their grandson) and Grace Hanbury, the seventh generation of the family to live in the house.

== Description ==
The park, north-west of the village, is bounded on the west by the River Great Ouse and on the east by Carlton Road. It has an area of 150 acres (61 ha).

The main entrance is near the parish church at the south end, where there is a stone lodge (Bottom Lodge, a Grade II listed building). A second entrance is on Carlton Road, also marked by a stone lodge (Top Lodge, Grade II listed), which leads to the courtyard on the north-eastern side of the house.

The house is in the centre of the park, on a slight rise above the river; there is a commanding view to the south-west across the park towards the river and beyond. The house is in Neoclassical style. The south-west front has seven bays, with Corinthian columns at the end bays; the north-east front has a tetrastyle Doric porch.

South-west of the house is a terrace and a small parterre; north of the house there is a walled kitchen garden, an ornamental garden and pleasure grounds. Beyond this there is parkland, planted with oak, beech, ash, lime, maple and poplar.
