= The Walks (urban park) =

Park in King's Lynn, Norfolk, England

Coordinates: 52.7518°N 0.4057°E

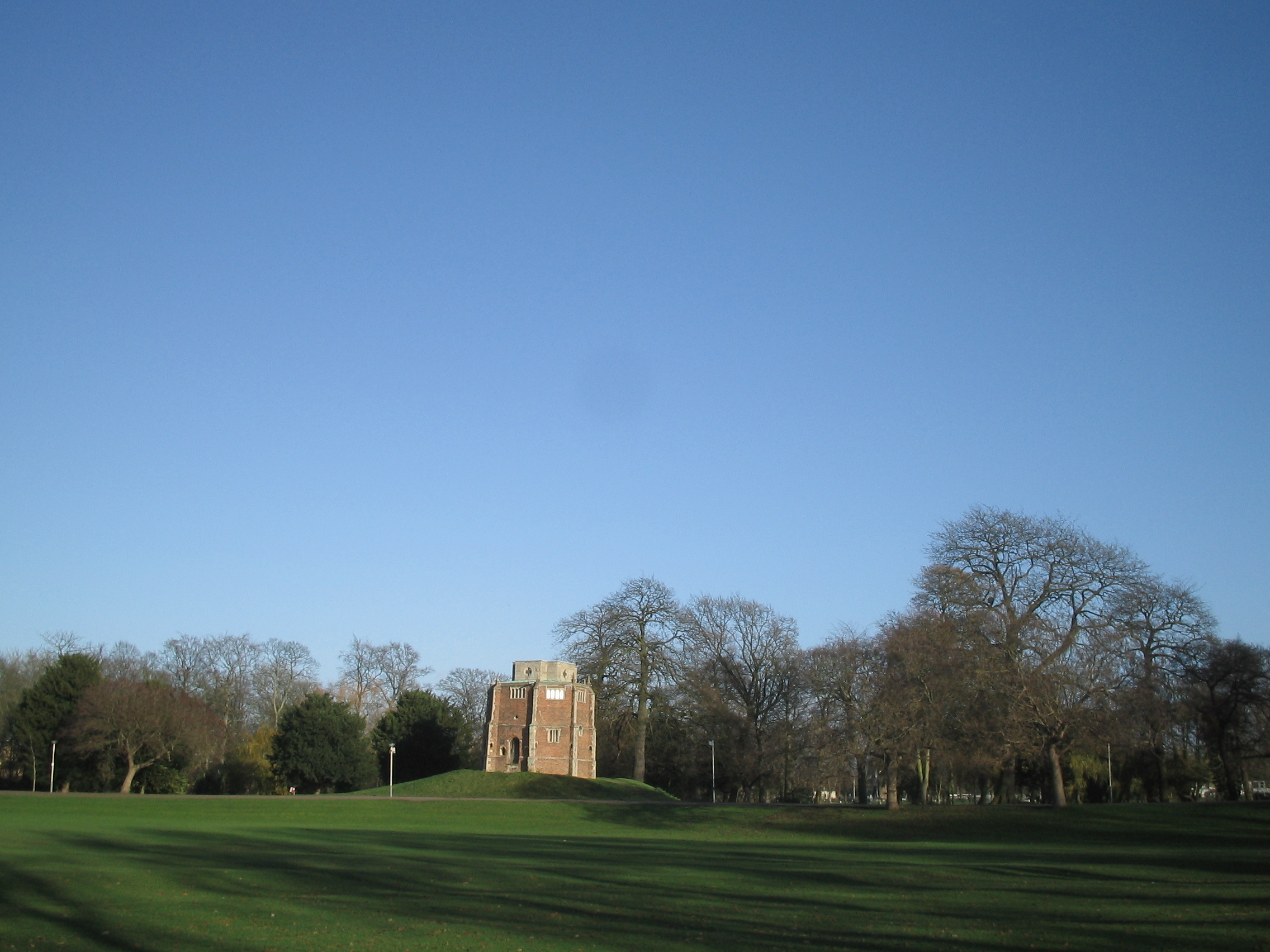
The Walks and Red Mount Chapel

The Walks is the premier urban park in King's Lynn, Norfolk.

== History ==
The Walks were originally established in the 18th century.

== Landmarks ==
=== Red Mount Chapel ===
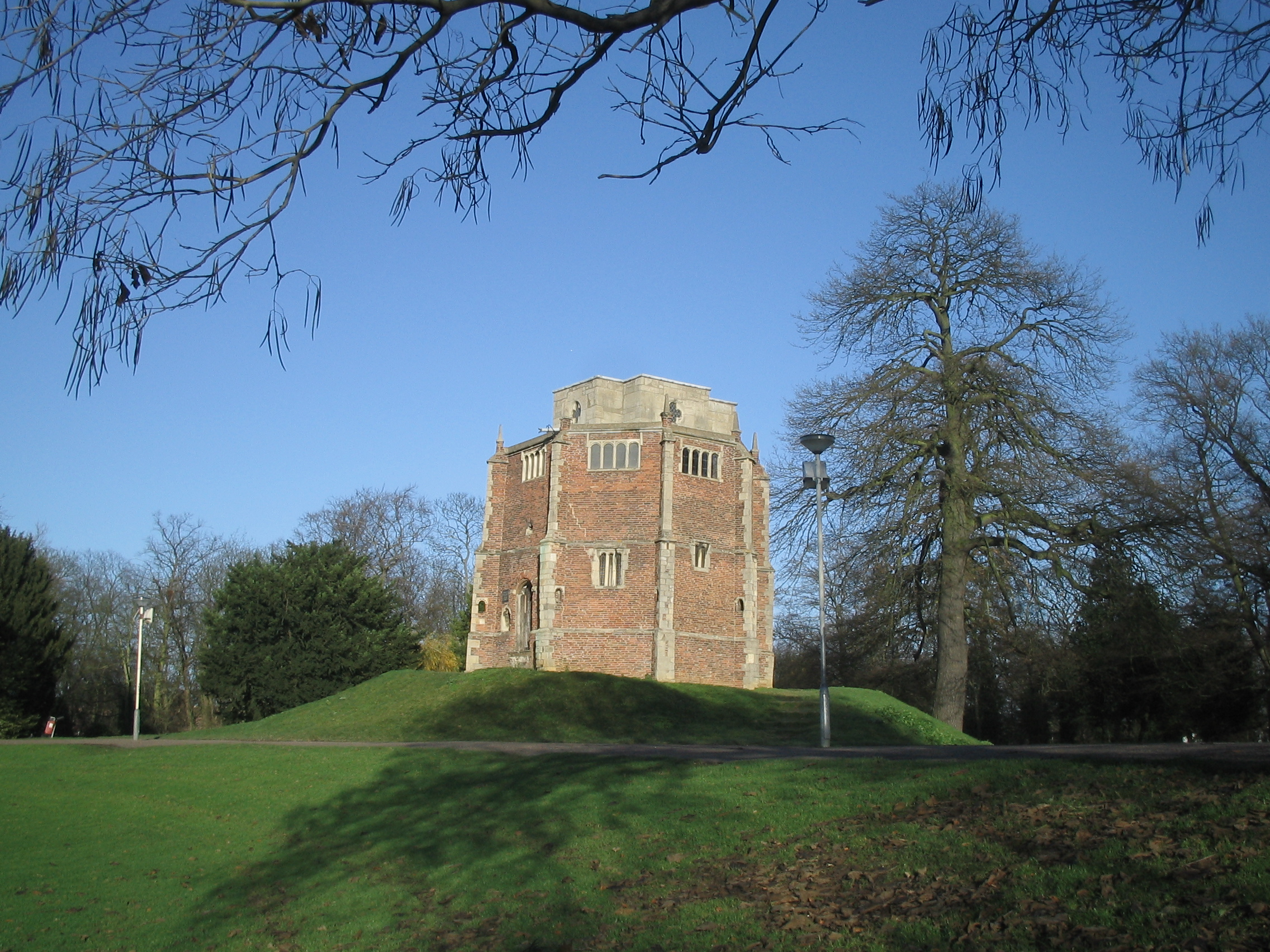
Red Mount Chapel

Sitting in the centre of The Walks is the Red Mount chapel, also known as 'Our Lady's Chapel' it is a Grade I listed building. It was built in the 15th century to contain a relic of the Virgin, but was also used by pilgrims on their way to Walsingham. It was built by Robert Corraunce on instructions from the Prior of Lynn. The inner core is divided into 3 storeys and there is an additional cross-shaped ashlar building in Ancaster stone on top. The Red Mount was the subject of a painting by Thomas Baines.

== Features ==
The park features footpaths, a bandstand, children's play areas, public toilets, a kiosk, picnicking and a historic chapel. The Walks is also the name of the football ground where King's Lynn Town F.C. play, located adjacent to the park.

== Events ==
King's Lynn parkrun takes place every Saturday morning at 9 am. The football ground has games most weekends and is located adjacent to the park hosting games for King's Lynn Town F.C.
