= Plantation Garden, Norwich =

Victorian town garden in Norwich, England

The Plantation Garden
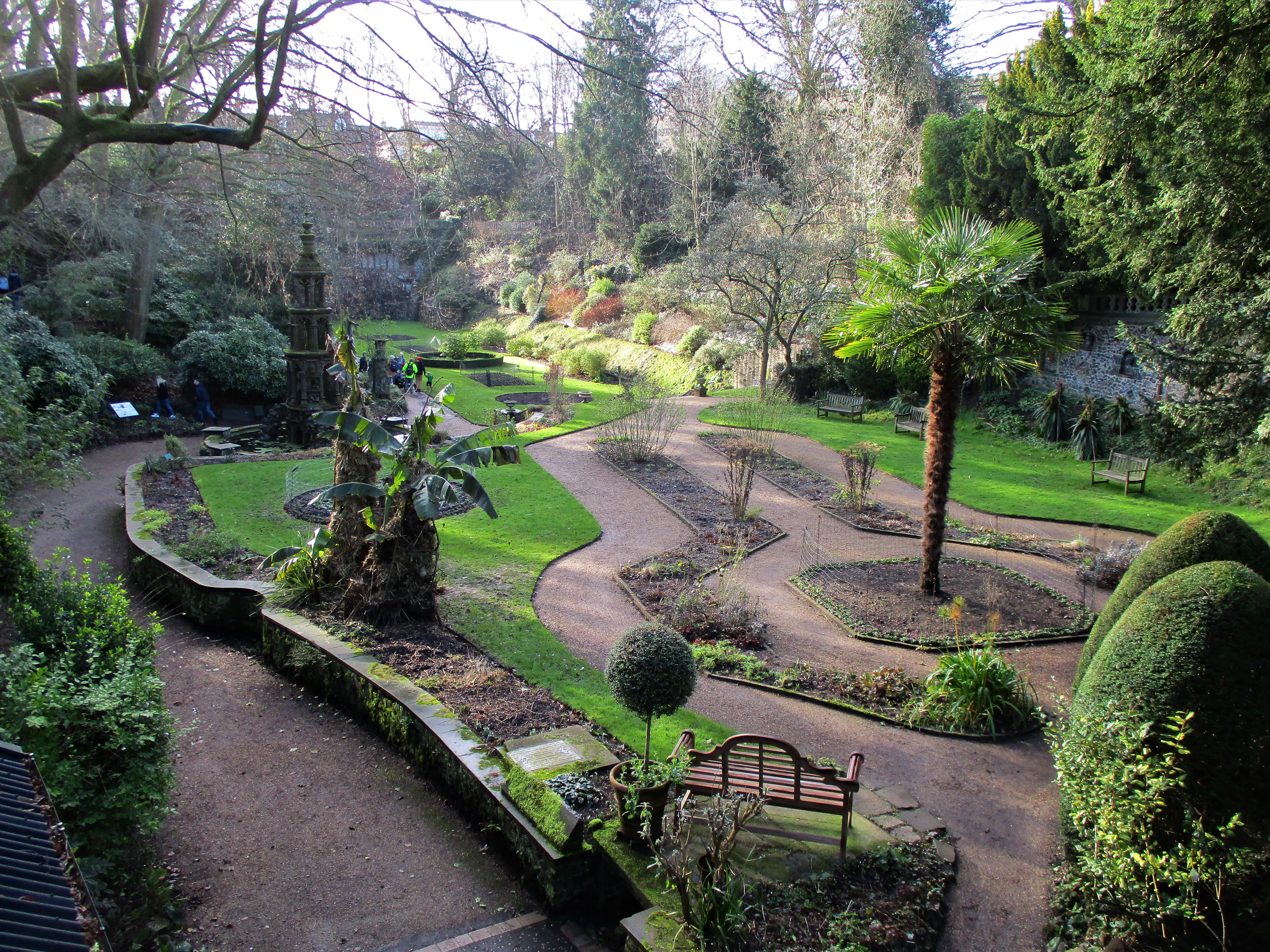
- The garden in January 2020
- Interactive map of The Plantation Garden
- 52.629°N 1.2819°E
- Type: Garden
- Location: Norwich

Site notes
- Restored by: Plantation Garden Preservation Trust

National Register of Historic Parks and Gardens
- Official name: The Plantation Garden
- Reference no.: 5048

Listed Building – Grade II
- Official name: The Plantation Garden, Norwich
- Designated: 18 September 1987
- Reference no.: 1001012

The Plantation Garden is a restored Victorian town garden located off Earlham Road, Norwich, Norfolk. Originally built in a disused lime quarry under the watch of shopkeeper and Baptist minister Henry Trevor (1819–97) whose house, 'The Plantation', resided on the land, As of 2021, visitors are asked to pay £2 to visit the garden, which is open daily throughout the year.

== The garden ==
Located off Earlham Road, the Plantation Garden is a restored Victorian town garden, maintained by volunteers, located in a former chalk quarry in Norwich. It includes a 'Gothic' fountain, flower beds, lawns, woodland walkways, rustic bridge, Italianate terrace, ‘Medieval’ terrace wall; and hundreds of architectural details fashionable in the mid 19th century. This idiosyncratic creation was described by The Telegraph as "a tycoon's folly".

== Background ==
The garden, located on Earlham Road, was established by Henry Trevor (1819–97), a Norwich shopkeeper. Trevor was additionally the final minister of the Pottergate Street Baptist Chapel in the parish of St Margaret from 1862 to 1897. A member of the Norfolk and Norwich Horticultural Society, he was known to be a particular fan of chrysanthemums. Living in Heigham, he built several houses in the area including his own, which he named 'The Plantation'. When Trevor and his family first moved into the house, much of the land was taken up a 2-or-3-acre (8,100 or 12,100 m^{2}) abandoned lime quarry, which was around 60 feet (18 m) in depth.

== History ==
Trevor envisioned turning the land into a productive garden, and so it was established with great expense. He gave the garden Italian terraces, fountains, gravelled walks and a large Palm House, additionally employing gardeners led by head gardener George Woodhouse who lived on the site with his family. Over a period of 40 years, the gardens became a showpiece that featured terraces, water features and rockeries surrounded by a large fountain, all styled on Italian Renaissance designs. It once featured eight glasshouses. The design may have been influenced by the architect Edward Boardman, who worked for Trevor on other projects. The gardens were always open to public use, and Trevor welcomed holidaymakers. Charitable functions were also held in the gardens, as were Sunday school treats.

Trevor died on 26 May 1897 after a stroke at 78 years of age; his funeral on 31 May began at the Plantation. J. H. Shakespeare gave an address here, and William Woodhouse, the head gardener, was one of five men to lead the cortège from the house and garden to the cemetery. After Trevor died in 1897, the gardens slowly became neglected. They fell into complete disrepair after World War II, and the garden was abandoned.

The garden was rediscovered in 1980, and the Plantation Garden Preservation Trust was established with the aim of rescuing and restoring the garden for the public. The art historian Roy Strong is a patron of the trust. In April 2016, the garden was forced to close as a result of structural damage to the terrace wall, following the collapse of an old mining tunnel in Earlham Road. The garden reopened on 23 April 2016. After three sinkholes opened up near the garden, Norwich City Council arranged to carry out underground probing work at the site, which was planned for 31 January 2017. Entrances to the garden were sealed off on 28 January. After further safety tests the garden reopened to the public on 15 March 2017.

== Sources ==
- Adam, Sheila (2009). The Plantation Garden; a history and guide (2nd ed.). Norwich: Plantation Garden Preservation Trust. OCLC 1114790125.
- Hipper, Kenneth (January 1999). "The Johnsonian Baptists in Norwich". Baptist Quarterly. 38 (1): 19–32. doi:10.1080/0005576X.1999.11752067. ISSN 0005-576X.
- Pyner, Tim (2004). "The Plantation Garden, Norwich". The British Pteridological Society. 6 (3). Loughton, Essex – via Internet Archive.
