= Bedford Park, Bedford =

Park in Bedford, United Kingdom

Bedford Park
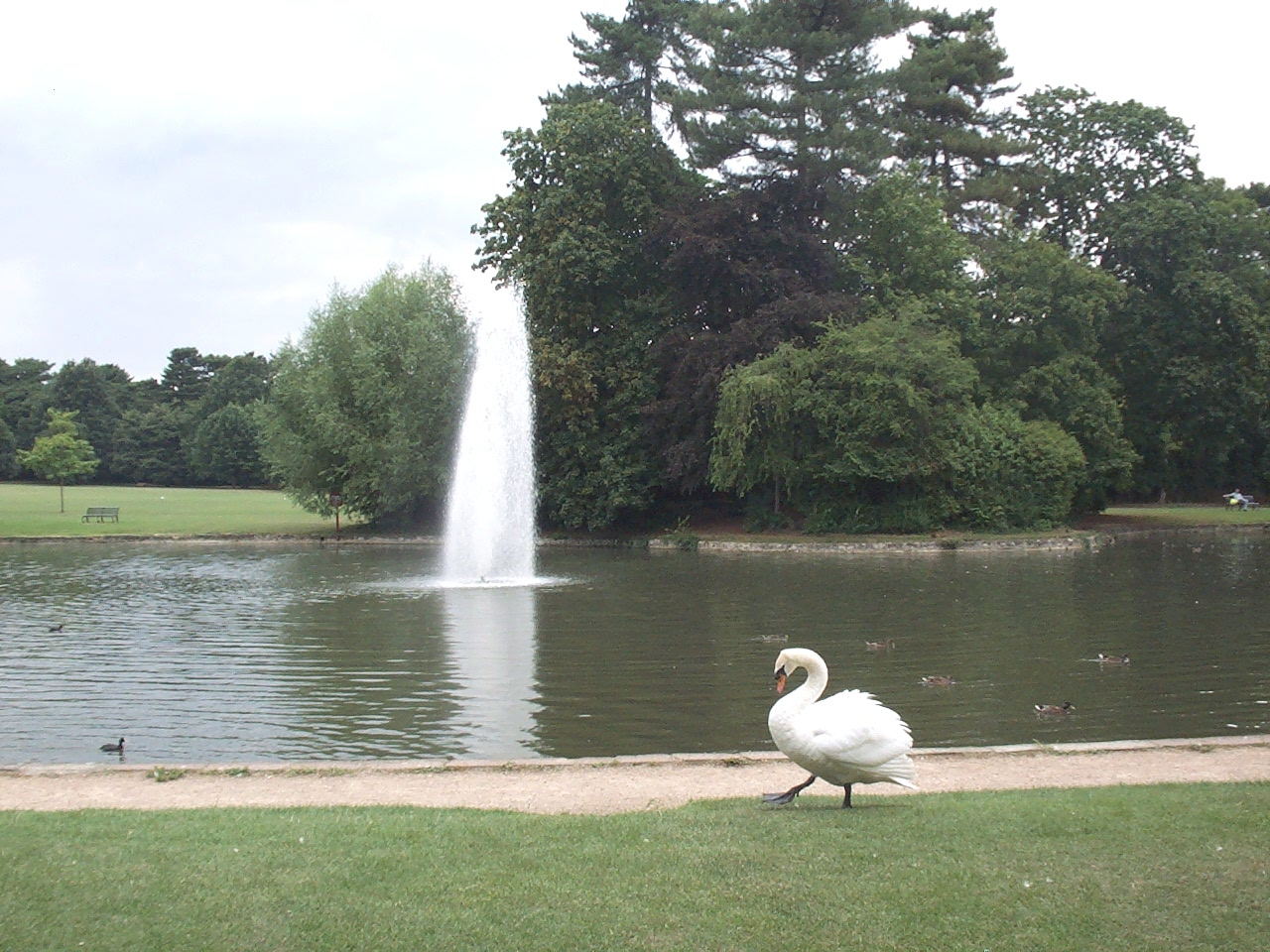
- Ornamental lake in the park
- Interactive map of Bedford Park
- Type: public park
- Location: Bedford, Bedfordshire; England
- Coordinates: 52.1475°N 0.46516°W
- Operator: Bedford Borough Council
- Open: All year

Bedford Park is a large urban park, located in the town of Bedford, Bedfordshire, England. The park is the largest urban park within the town, and it is owned and maintained by Bedford Borough Council and is Grade II listed in Historic England's Register of Parks and Gardens.

Bedford Park was constructed and planted in the 19th century, as the town of Bedford expanded northwards. The park was developed at the same time as Bedford's first municipal cemetery, which is located directly to the north of the park. Today, the cemetery is no longer used as a major burial ground for the town, but the park is still very much in use.

The general Victorian design of Bedford Park has been maintained to this day. The park has many mature trees and shrubs, as well as herbaceous borders and naturalised bulb borders (including daffodils, wood anemones and crocuses). The park's original bandstand is still in use, as is the original cricket pavilion, which is maintained along with a full size cricket pitch.

Other sporting facilities at the park include areas for tennis, football, rounders and basketball. There is also a bowling green. Robinson Pool is located in the southwest corner of Bedford Park, and is the main public swimming pool in Bedford.

Other facilities at the park include two children's playgrounds and a café. Bedford Park was awarded Green Flag status in 2007 & 2008, joining Priory Country Park to become the second park in Bedford to win the prestigious national award.
