= Ickwell Bury =

Coordinates: 52.0959°N 0.3285°W

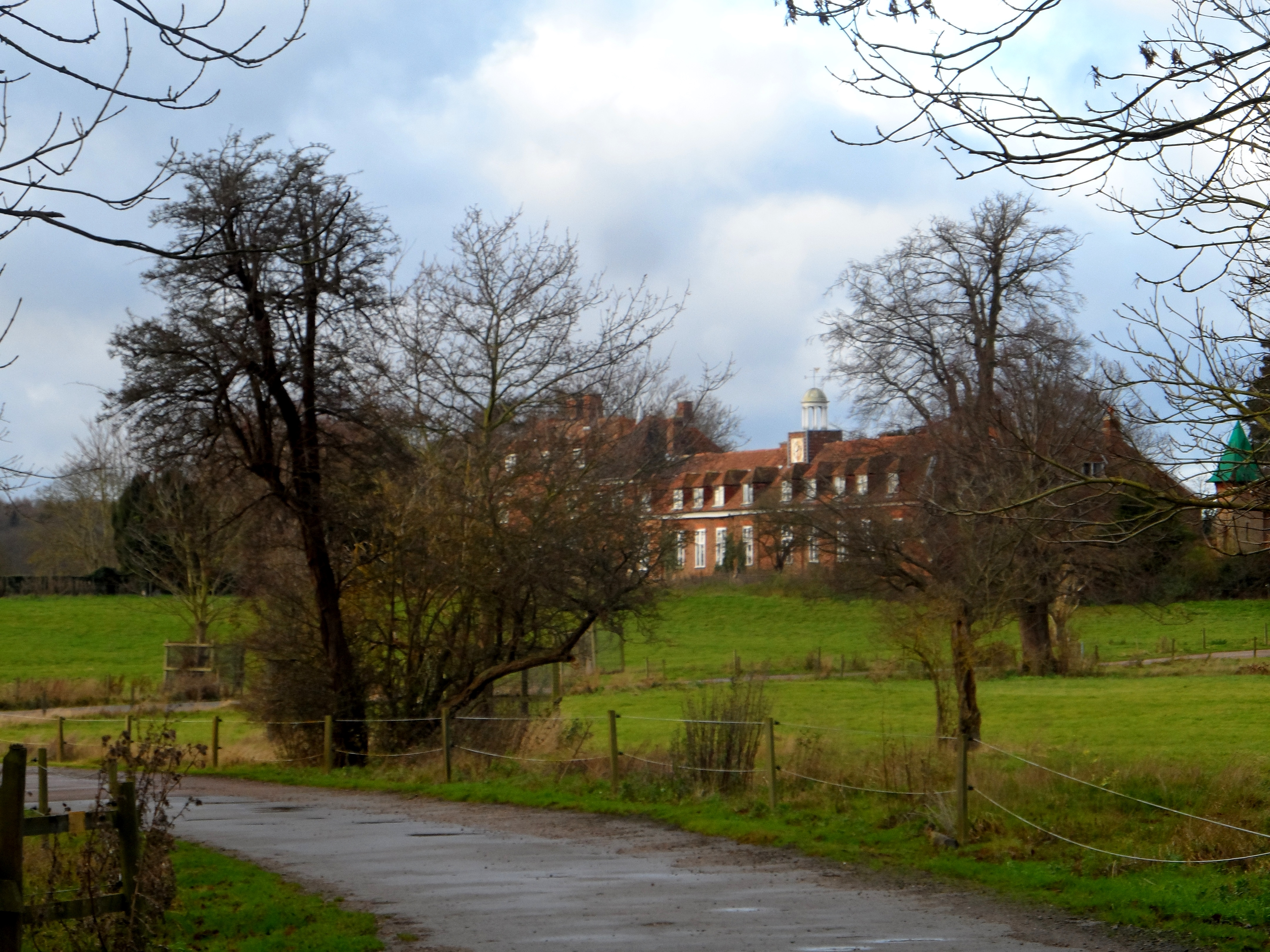

Ickwell Bury, at the heart of the former manor of Ickwell, Bedfordshire, was first built by John Harvey in 1683 near the site of an older manor house. The Harvey family continued to own the house until 1925, although from 1900 it had housed Horton Preparatory School.

In 1898, Ickwell Bury was the property of John Edmund Audley Harvey DL JP and was described as "a mansion of red brick, in the Queen Anne style, standing in a park and woodlands of about five hundred acres, approached by an avenue of trees about a mile in length".

The school closed in 1937, and soon afterwards most of the empty house was destroyed in a fire, though a 17th-century wing with its Thomas Tompion clock were saved. The property was then bought by Colonel George Hayward Wells, chairman of the brewery Charles Wells, who rebuilt the house on a smaller scale and on his death left the Ickwell Bury estate to the Bedford Charity to be used by Bedford School, his own old school. The school uses the grounds for field studies and as a conservation reserve, and for a number of years Ickwell Bury (the house) was rented from the school by the Yoga for Health Foundation and was open all year round. It was especially busy during the summer months where all the rooms were open and tents covered the grounds around the main house.

In 1999 Bedford School sold Ickwell Bury and its garden - it is now a private house - and in 2013/14 it sold the remaining 47 hectares of farmland, a cottage, and (with planning permission for conversion to homes) the listed barns of Home Farm.

In a wood between Ickwell Bury and Northill church is an ancient earthwork, with a high bank on the east side, enclosing long pools which are thought to have been fish ponds for the monks of a college at Northill or for the priory of Ickwell Bury.
