= Chantry Park =

Park in Suffolk, England

Coordinates: 52.053190°N 1.1173975°E

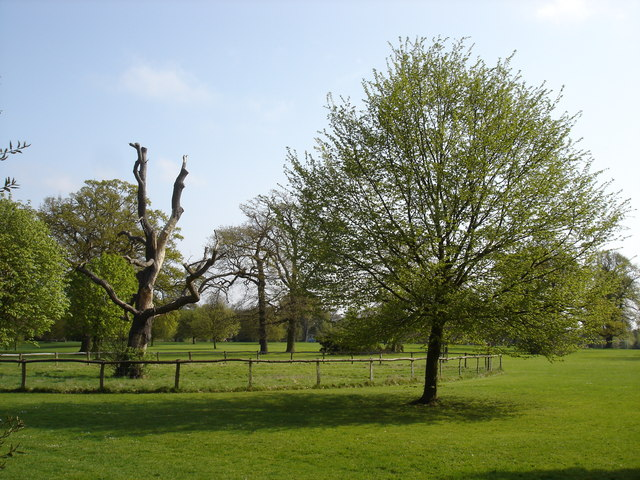

- Location within Suffolk
- Area: 0.50181 km^{2} (0.19375 sq mi)
- District: Ipswich
- Shire county: Suffolk
- Region: East
- Country: England
- Sovereign state: United Kingdom
- Police: Suffolk
- Fire: Suffolk
- Ambulance: East of England

Chantry Park is a park located west of Ipswich town centre, in the Ipswich district, in the county of Suffolk, England. It is the largest park in Ipswich and extends over 124 acres. Chantry Park was opened to the public on 17 May 1928 and was designated a Conservation Area in 2005.

Chantry Park itself is Grade II listed park, and it contains three Grade II listed structures: The Chantry and the gate house and entrance gatepiers (which share a listing).

== The Chantry ==
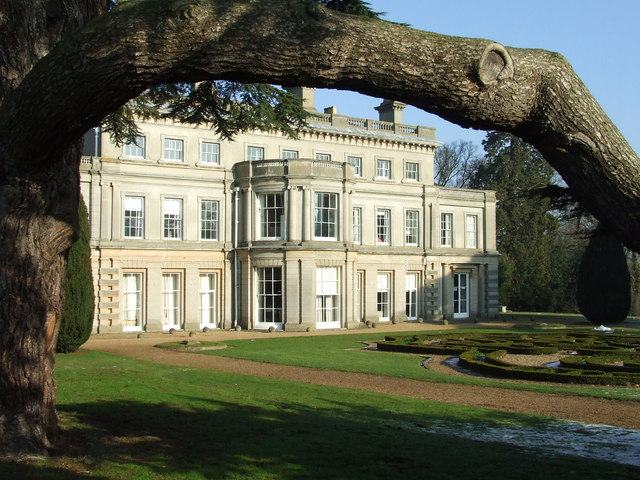
Chantry with parterre

The Chantry is a large mansion built in the eighteenth century, and substantially altered in the nineteenth century. At one time the mansion was the home of Sir Fitzroy Edward Kelly, a prominent lawyer, politician and judge, who sat as Member of Parliament for the Ipswich constituency.

== Events ==
In 1934, Chantry Park hosted that year's Royal Agricultural Show, organised by the Royal Agricultural Society of England.

From 23 to 26 August 2019 around 160,000 people attended Ed Sheeran's ÷ Tour. After the shows, work to partly restore the park began on 2 September 2019.
