= Heigham Park =

Public park in Norwich, England

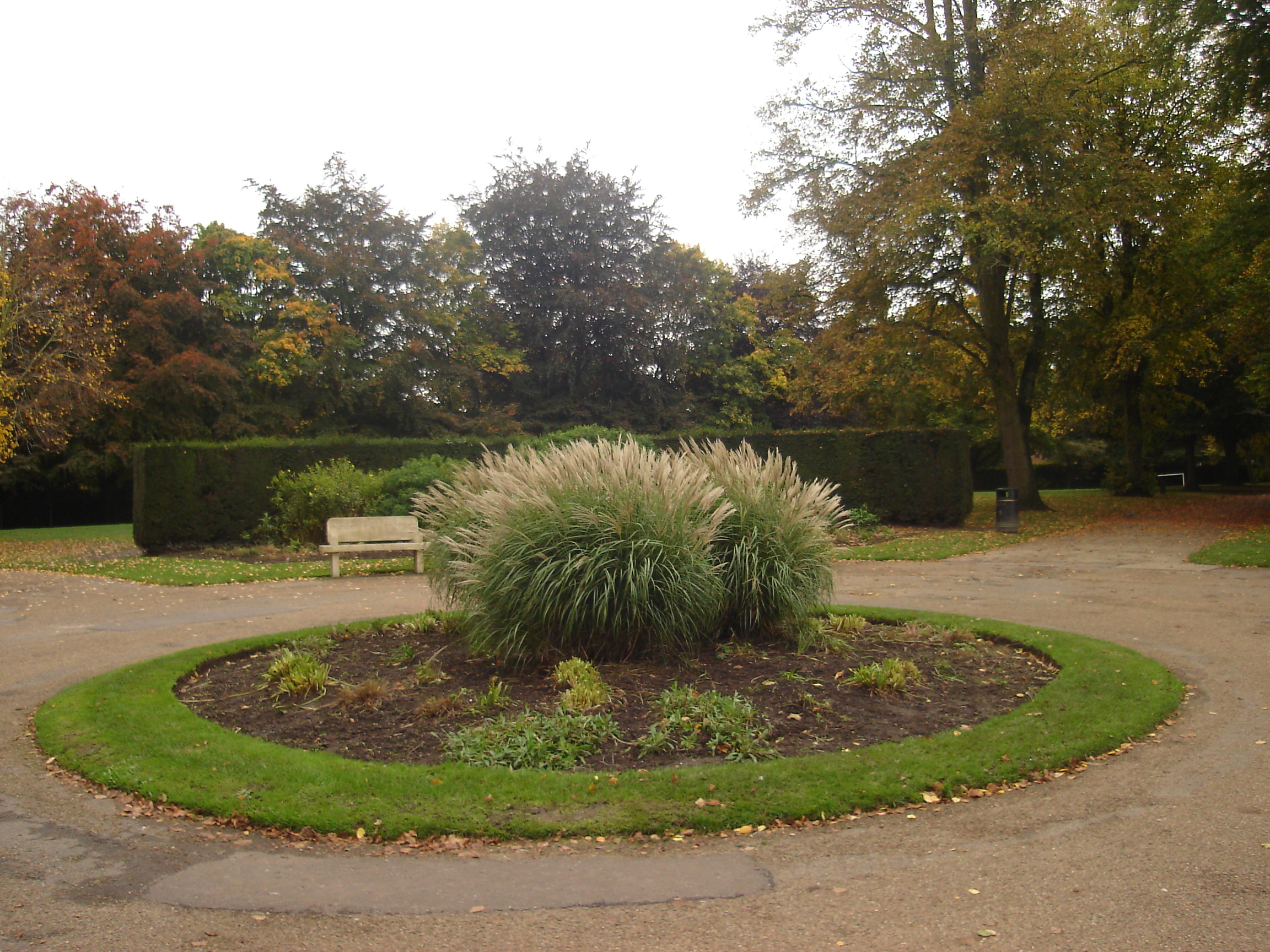
- Interactive map of Heigham Park
- Type: Public
- Location: Norwich
- OS grid: TG 21285 08111
- Coordinates: 52.6256°N 1.2681°E
- Area: 6 acres (24,000 m^{2})
- Opened: 1924
- Designer: Arnold Sandys-Winsch
- Administered by: Norwich City Council

Heigham Park (/hæiəm/ "hay-um") is a grade II listed public park and Site of Special Historic Interest in Norwich. The small park was opened on Jessop Road, to its south, in 1924. It also borders The Avenues to the north, Christchurch Road to the west, and Recreation Road to the east.

The park began as cornfields and pastureland before being converted into Heigham Playing Fields for the two nearby schools, opening in November 1909. Housing expanded, and in the 1920s a part of the area was set aside for Heigham Park, designed by Captain Arnold Sandys-Winsch and opened in 1924, the first of his designed gardens. Sports, particularly tennis, were important in the park from its outset. During World War II, military and/or civil defence structures were present in Heigham Park. It has seen some refurbishments since.

== Description ==
The park features herbaceous borders, circular flowerbeds, pergolas, and areas for sport. Its only entrance is through an iron gate at the north-east corner. It features a central circle which formerly had a fountain and pool, but has since been filled in. Paths from this circle divide the park into unequal segments. The eastern part of the park features a children's playground, the southern segment has an open grassed area, which was initially designed to lead into a circular rose garden which is now also the playground. To the north is a bowling green, toilets, and bicycle park. The western half is bisected by a walk to an ironwork screen and gate and tennis courts with a pavilion. In the south-west corner is a second bowling green, with a pergola that incorporates a pavilion.

== History ==
The area was initially open countryside; in early 1909, these cornfields and pastureland stretched to Earlham Hall, and the area bordered the Church of England Young Men's Society (CEYMS) sports field to the north. This CEYMS field was also known as 'The Rec', and the team were successful until 1902 when its captain and the vice-captain left to form Norwich City F.C. Houses in the area had been built as far as Recreation Road; Glebe Road and The Avenues had not yet been built in 1909. That year, £100 were raised at a parents' meeting to purchase the area and hand it over to the mayor of Norwich to create Heigham Playing Field. This was encouraged Open Spaces Society as well as the headmasters from Avenue Road and Crooks Place schools. At the opening ceremony for Heigham Playing Fields in November 1909, the mayor kicked off a football match between the two schools for the boys, and for the girls the Sheriff of Norwich threw the first ball in a basketball or netball game. Housing increased over time as was the Avenues, splitting Heigham Playing Field from the CEYMS field. Heigham Playing Fields bordered open countryside on their west.

Housing began to spread during a late Victorian and Edwardian expansion of the suburbs, and the city made the decision to covert 6 acres (24,000 m^{2}) of the site into a park. It was the first design of Captain Arnold Sandys-Winsch, the first parks superintendent in Norwich. Work began in 1921, taking three years. The original local bowls club existed prior to the park itself, with a list of presidents dating back to 1922. Heigham Park opened in 1924. It was the first of Sandys-Winsch's parks to be opened, and was considered to be the first 'modern' park in the city. The design contained ten grass tennis courts, two bowling greens, and a space for casual games. Its opening took place at the height of popularity of tennis, leading to crowded courts. A planned expansion of the courts in the 1930s stalled due to the economic crisis of the time.

There are some traces of World War II military and/or civil defence activity and structures visible on wartime aerial photographs of the park in the 1940s, though it is unclear exactly what these were. In 1993, Heigham and other Sandys-Winsch parks were placed on the Register of Parks and Gardens of Special Historic Interest, with Heigham being Grade II. The original Sandys-Winsch thatched tennis pavilion was refurbished in the 1990s using Heritage Lottery funding. The last of the grass tennis courts in the park closed in 2017; these were the last grass courts to exist in the city's parks. The tennis pavilion largely burned down in 2019. The courts and pavilion were due to be replaced in 2022 with three new all-weather, hard surfaced and floodlit courts. Heigham Park celebrated its hundredth anniversary in 2024.
