= Waterloo Park, Norwich =

Public park in Norwich, UK

Coordinates: 52°38′42″N 01°17′20″E

Waterloo Park
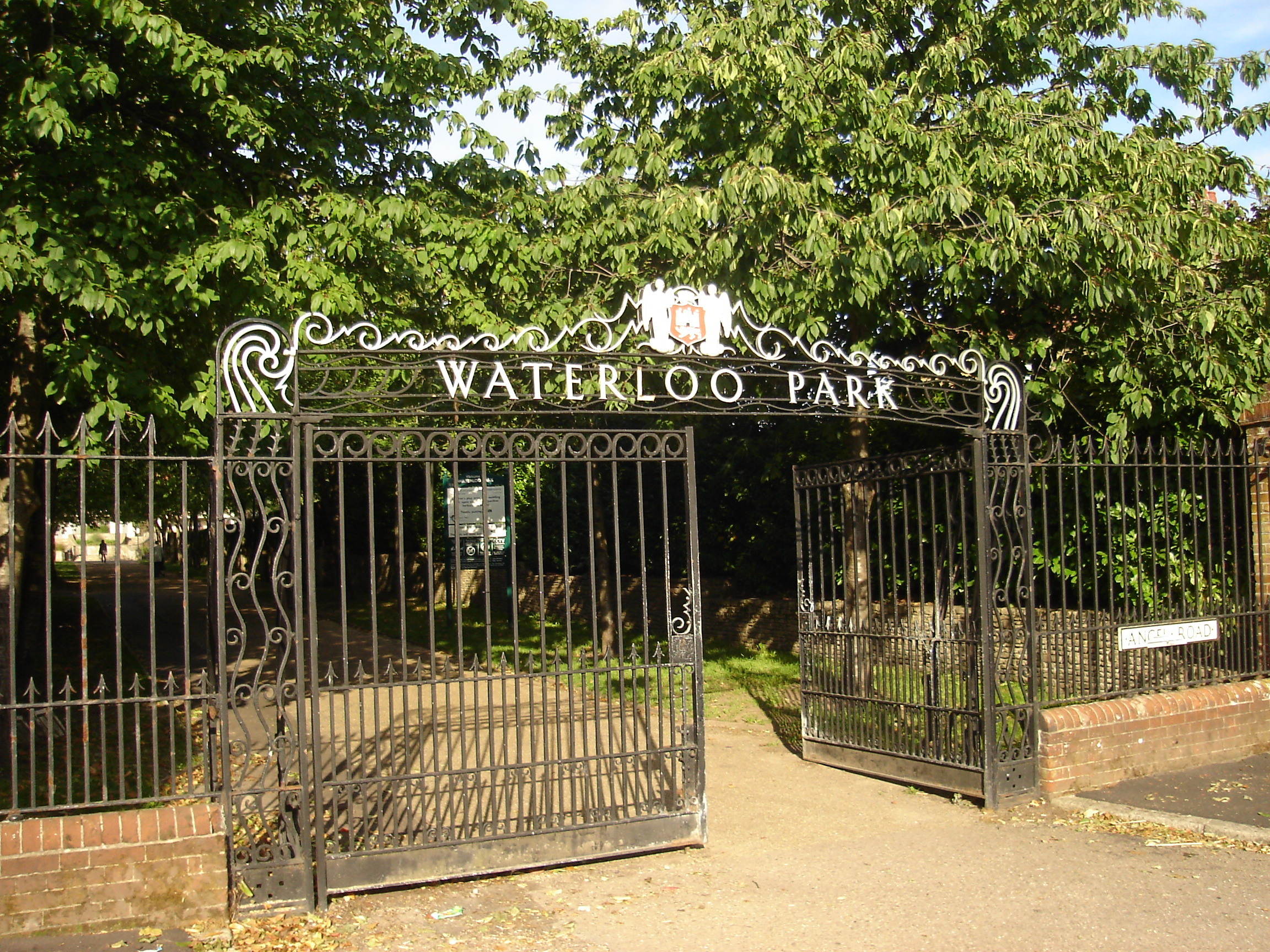
- The main pedestrian entrance on Angel Road
- Interactive map of Waterloo Park
- Type: Public
- Location: Angel Road, Norwich, Norfolk, UK
- Area: 18 acres (7.3 ha)
- Created: 1904 (redesigned park opened in 1933)
- Designer: Captain Arnold Sandys-Winsch
- Operator: Norwich City Council
- Open: daylight hours
- Status: Grade II* listed
- Parking: free

Waterloo Park is a Grade II* listed public park in Norwich, Norfolk. It forms one of a set of public parks established in Norwich in the 1930s by Captain Arnold Sandys-Winsch that were built by unemployed men using government funding. The original open space, then known as the Catton Recreation Ground, was opened as Waterloo Park in May 1904. When the redesigned park was opened in 1933, it was considered to be the finest in East Anglia, with a pavilion in the style of Moderne architecture, a bandstand, sports facilities, gardens and a children's playground. The herbaceous border is one of the longest in the United Kingdom located within a public space.

The layout of Waterloo Park has remained largely unaltered since the 1930s, although changes have since been made to the original children's garden, the bowling greens and most of the grass tennis courts. Following years of relative neglect, the park's main buildings were restored in 2000, and the long-closed pavilion was reopened as a café in 2017; after being forced to close three years later, it reopened in November 2021. The park is maintained by Norwich City Council. In 2021, 2022 and 2023, the park was awarded Green Flag status; in 2023 it received for the first time a Green Heritage award.

== History ==
Waterloo Park owes its existence to the work of the Norwich Playing Fields and Open Spaces Society, which saw how the urban population in the Angel Road area of Norwich was increasing rapidly, and so worked with the city authorities to preserve land for use as a recreational space. A plot of land surrounded by housing owned by the Great Hospital Trust was leased to the city in 1899. The park, then known as Catton Recreation Ground, was redesigned to include gardens created by local schoolchildren, and opened in May 1904 with a new name, Waterloo Park. In 1911, a proposal was made by the manufacturer Edwards & Holmes to build a shoe factory on part of the land occupied by the park, an idea which never went past the application stage.

The park was completely redesigned in 1929 by Captain Arnold Sandys-Winsch, (Note: Sandys-Winsch, who was articled to the British landscape architect Thomas Hayton Mawson, fought during World War I as an officer in the Royal Field Artillery and then as an aircraft pilot.) who had been appointed as the Norwich City Parks and Gardens Superintendent in 1919. With government funding provided to give temporary relief for unemployed local men, work on the new park was able to start. At 18 acres (7.3 ha), it was the second largest of a series of parks laid out by Sandys-Winsch in Norwich. Completed and opened to the public in 1933, it was the last of a series of parks to be designed by Sandys-Winsch, at a cost of £37,000; (Note: In 2017, £37,000 was worth approximately £1,700,000.) at the time it was "considered to be one of the finest in East Anglia". By the time he retired in 1956, he had helped to create 600 acres (240 ha) of urban parks and open spaces in Norwich, and was instrumental in the planting of 20,000 trees in the city.

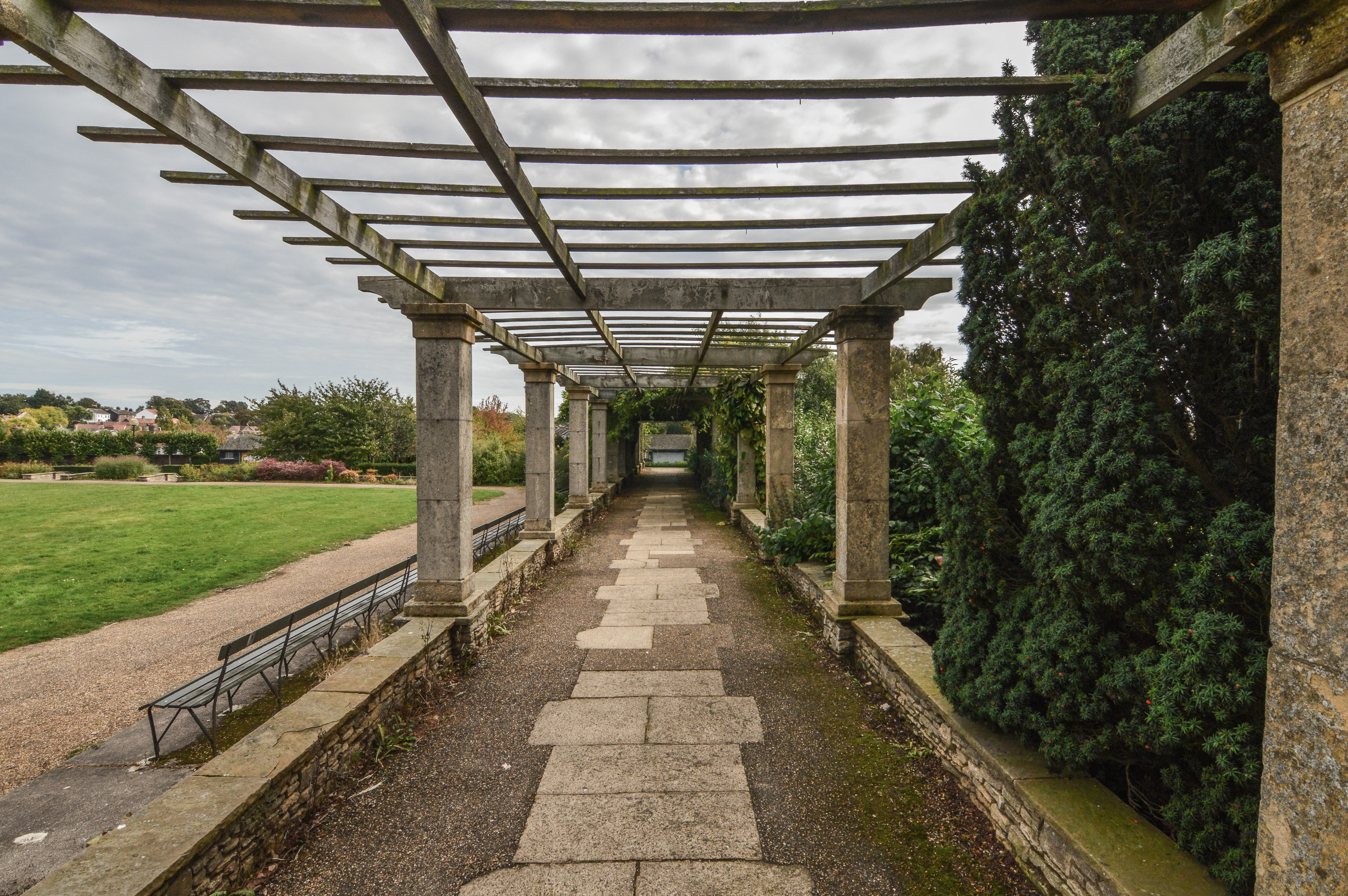
One of the pergolas at Waterloo Park

The central pavilion in Waterloo Park was used as a temporary mortuary during World War II. After one air raid, the bodies of factory workers from across the other side of Norwich arrived at the park under police escort, to the horror of people using the nearby tennis courts, who had been unaware of the raid that had happened.

Waterloo Park is historically important; its pavilion, pergolas, bandstand and front gates have been designated as Grade II* listed structures, and the park itself is Grade II* listed, as it is considered to be a good example of an early 20th-century municipal park. The overall layout has remained largely unchanged since the 1930s, and it has been recognised by Norwich City Council as an 'historic landscape'. Some of the facilities have been modified, so that original features such as the school garden at the northern tip of the park, and the moat around the edge of the central garden, no longer exist. In 1962, £1000 was spent by the council in renovating the pavilion, an expense which was criticized by the local press at the time.

== Recent history ==
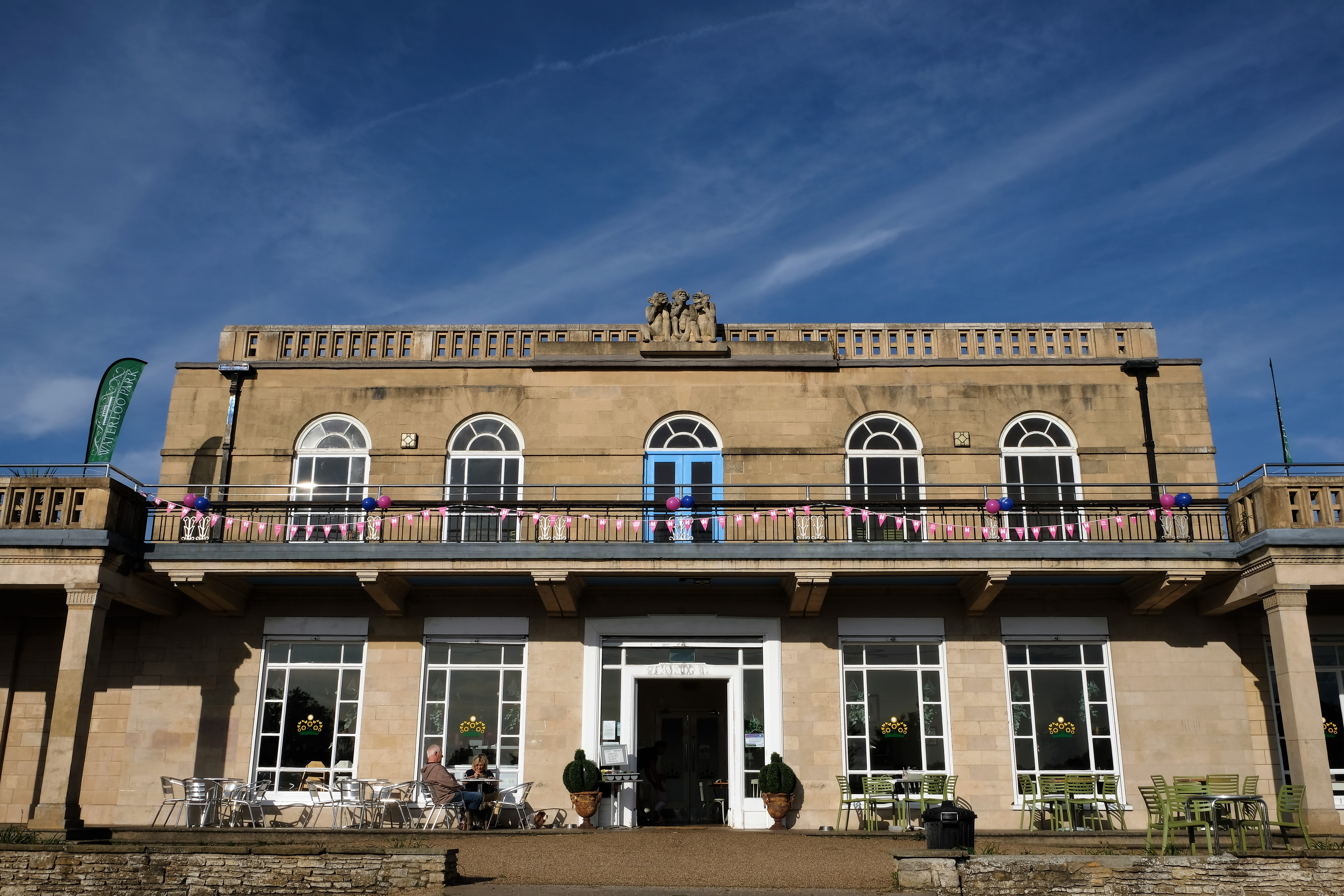
The pavilion in 2019

The work carried out by the Countryside Commission in the early 1970s failed to provide for the needs of urban parks in the UK, and after losing its permanent team of dedicated staff during this period, the buildings and landscape within Waterloo Park started to deteriorate. Neglect has since led to the bowling greens and their pavilions being abandoned. The park was amongst the earliest to be placed on the Register of Historic Parks and Gardens of Special Historic Interest in England, when it was included on the list in 1993. In 2000, Norwich City Council was amongst the first recipients to succeed in obtaining funds from the Urban Parks Programme of the National Lottery Heritage Fund to restore its historic parks. It used part of the £5.6 million it received to restore Waterloo Park's pavilion and many of its facilities. The Three Wise Monkeys sculpture on the roof of the pavilion was commissioned during this period of restoration. The sculpture is a version of the Japanese pictorial maxim of the three wise monkeys, embodying the proverbial principle "see no evil, hear no evil, speak no evil". Research revealed that it had been intended to include the Three Wise Monkeys as a central motif when the pavilion was designed in the 1930s. When the building was being restored, a 'modern take' on the traditional motif was suggested, with the incorporation of a photographer monkey, as well as one listening to music and another speaking on the telephone. The equipment incorporated into the sculpture was out of date even during its installation.

In 2015, Norwich City Council resolved to deal with problems with the water-damaged roof of Waterloo Park's pavilion by spending £210,000 on repairs that year, and £40,000 during 2016/17. In 2017, after the main repairs had been completed, the restored pavilion was reopened as a café, as part of an enterprise to assist low-risk prisoners and ex-offenders to gain work experience. Working in partnership with the council, Britannia Enterprises planned to run the café as well as help maintain and restore the park. After Britannia Enterprises went into liquidation in August 2019, the café was threatened with closure; it was closed in January 2020 after a new manager was unable to continue running the establishment.

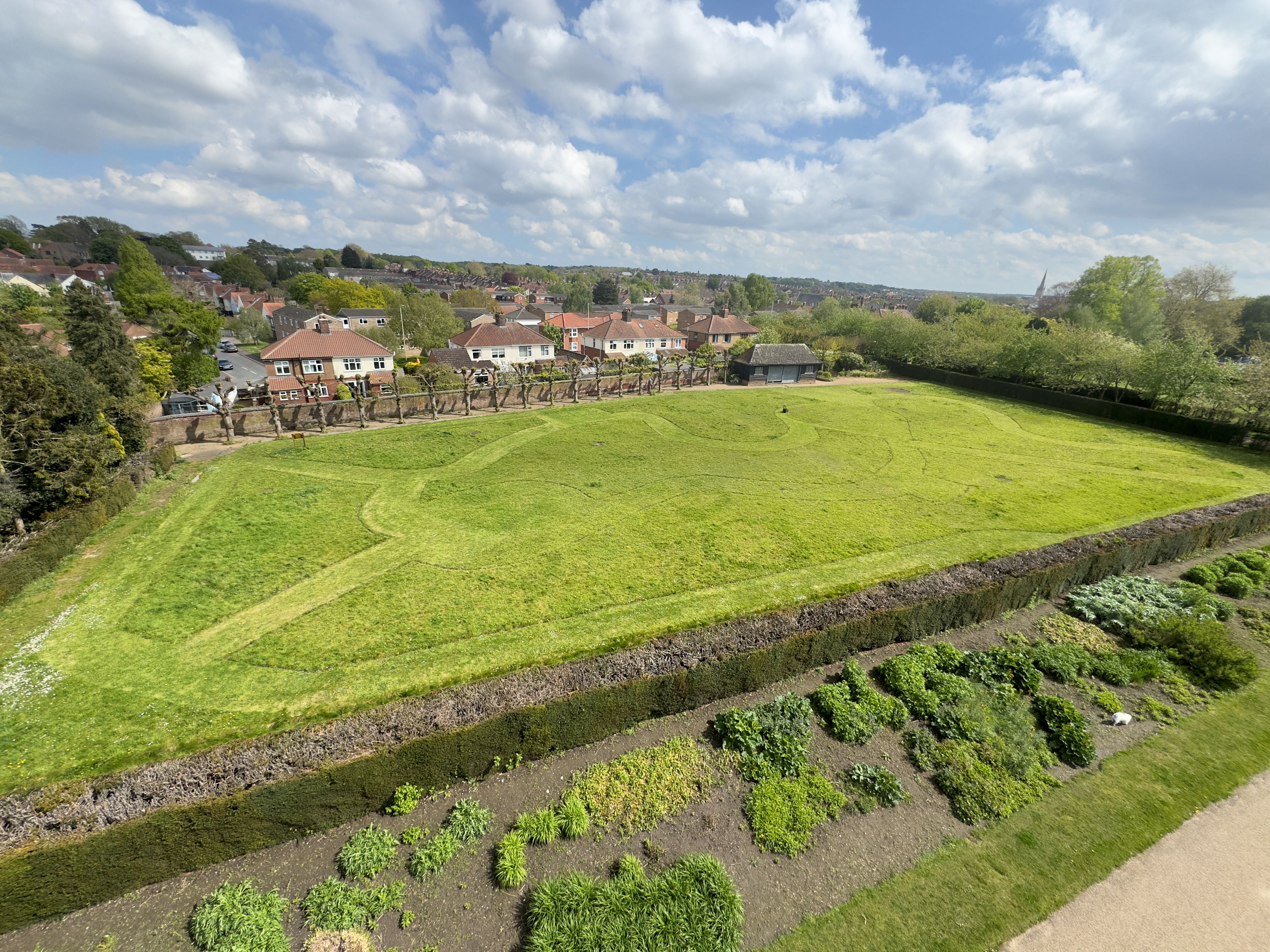
Land in the process of being converted into a wildflower meadow

In 2018 the Friends of Waterloo Park was set up, with the initial aim of bringing more sporting opportunities, children's activities and live music to the park. The park was included in the city council's tree planting list for 2018–2019, to include examples that included silver birch, Himalayan birch, Davidia involucrata and southern magnolia. In 2023, the park was awarded Green Flag status for the fourth year in a row, and for the first time received a Green Heritage award.

Maintenance work began on the café in April 2021 after £36,000 was approved by Norwich City Council to be used in its refurbishment, prior to the premises being reopened. A spokesperson for the council revealed that it intended "to return the café up to its top standard, so a new tenant can breathe life back into it and the doors can once again be opened for the community to enjoy". The café officially re-opened for business on 6 November 2021, run by not-for-profit social enterprise The Feed.

== Facilities ==
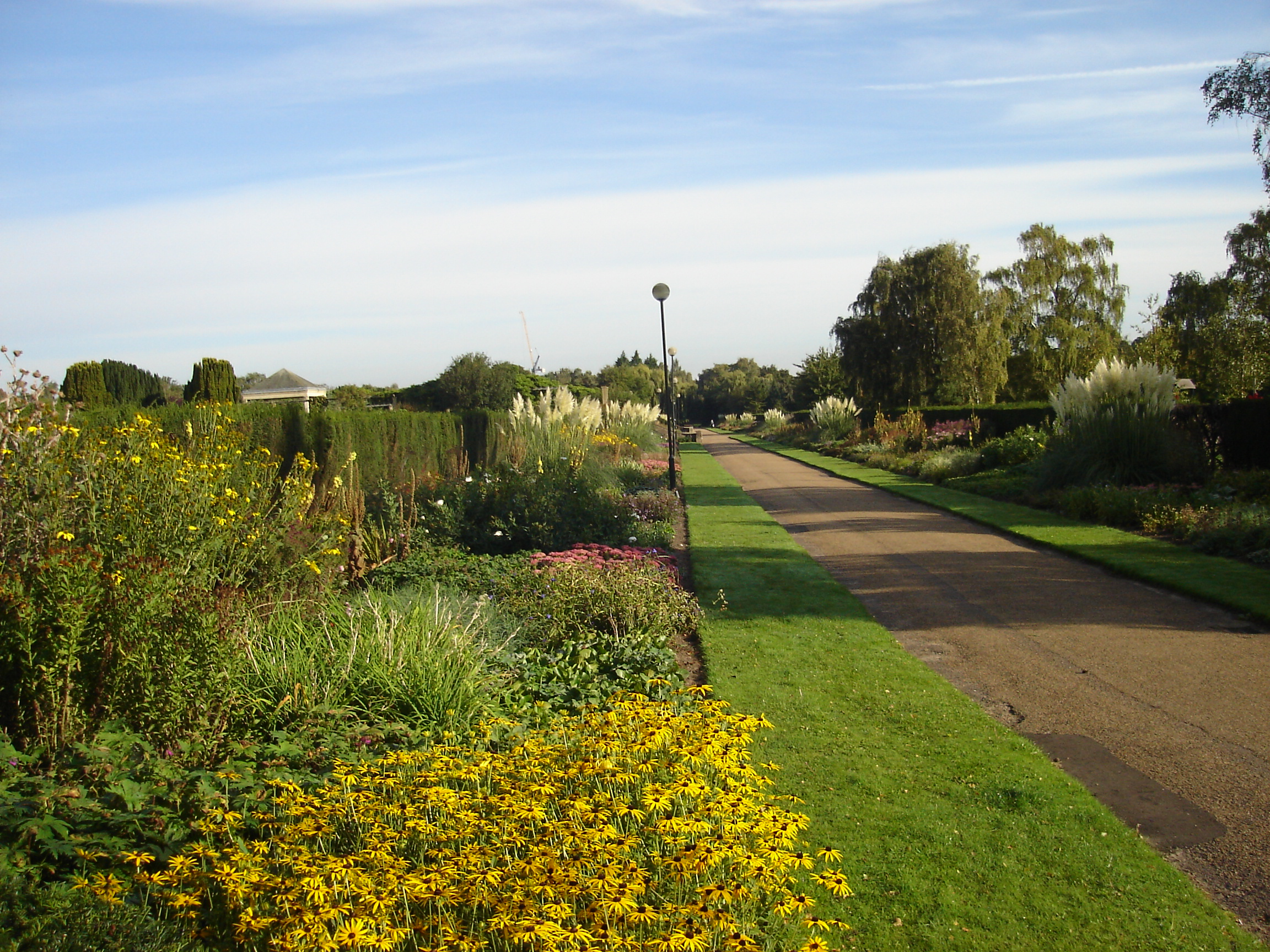
The southern end of Waterloo Park's herbaceous border

George Ismael of Norwich City Council has described Waterloo Park as representing "the last phase of municipal park building in Britain". It has been described as having "stylistic unity" with Norwich's other historic public spaces, and a design that "displays a sensitive response to the [surrounding] landscape". Everywhere in the park can be accessed by disabled visitors. There are 6 acres (2.4 ha) of gardens, dominated by the bandstand and the Art Deco central pavilion. The park has a children's playground, hardcourt tennis courts, open areas once used to play cricket and hockey matches, and toilet facilities. The pavilion, bandstand, pergolas, steps and walls are all built from a form of reconstituted stone which looks natural. The children's play area, with its Splash Pad, was upgraded in May 2024.

Waterloo Park has one of the UK's largest herbaceous borders located within a public space. The largest flowerbeds once contained roses and annuals. These became expensive to maintain, and the beds are now planted with perennials and bushes, plants that can be sustained ecologically. According to Ismail, this type of planting is a return to the ideas of the gardener William Robinson and the horticulturist Gertrude Jekyll, and is "completely at one with the period during which the [Norwich] parks were created".

=== Location and access ===
Waterloo Park is 1.5 miles (2.4 km) north of Norwich's city centre. The park is bounded on the east by Angel Road, and to the west by Aylsham Road (the A1402). To the south is Angel Road Infant School, and Philadelphia Lane lies to the north. There is parking, accessed from Angel Road, and two bus routes from the city centre pass nearby.

== Sources ==
- Anderson, A.P.; Cocke, Sarah (2000). The Captain and the Norwich Parks. Norwich: The Norwich Society. ISBN 978-0-9524756-1-3.
- Fieldhouse, Ken; Woodstra, Jan, eds. (2000). The Regeneration of Public Parks. London and New York: E & FN Spon. ISBN 978-0-419-25900-8.
- Ismail, George (Spring 1998). Clarke, Ethna (ed.). "The Norwich Parks". Norfolk Gardens Trust Journal. OCLC 851433783.
- Meeres, Frank (1998). A History of Norwich. Chichester: Phillimore & Co. Ltd. ISBN 978-1-86077-083-8.
- Mieder, Wolfgang (1981). "The Proverbial Three Wise Monkeys". Midwestern Journal of Language and Folklore (7): 5–38. ISSN 0363-9967.
- Rawcliffe, Carole; Wilson, Richard, eds. (2004). Norwich Since 1550. London and New York: Hambleton and London. ISBN 978-1-85285-450-8.
