= Eaton Park =

Public park in Norwich, England

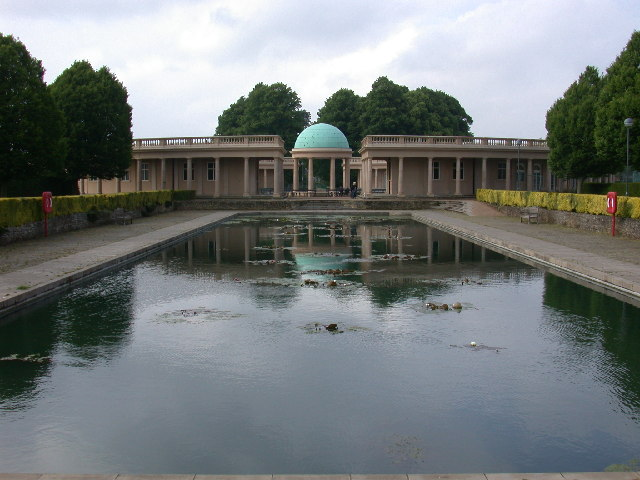
- Lily pond with The Rotunda in the background
- Interactive map of Eaton Park
- Type: Public
- Location: Eaton, Norwich, Norfolk, England
- Coordinates: 52.620°N 1.255°E
- Area: 80 acres (320,000 m^{2})
- Opened: 1928
- Designer: Captain Sandys-Winsch
- Operator: Norwich City Council

Eaton Park is a grade II* listed public park located in Eaton, Norwich, England. The site is 80 acres (320,000 m^{2}) in area. It was the largest of the series of parks designed by Captain Sandys-Winsch in Norwich. Largely unchanged from its original layout after opening in 1928, it features a selection of grade II listed buildings.

== History ==
The city bought the site of the park in 1906, aided by the Norwich Playing Fields and Open Spaces Society. It remained a simple open area of grass until city parks and gardens superintendent Captain Sandys-Winsch, a protégé of Thomas Mawson, designed the park in a classical style in the 1920s, and plans were made for its construction in 1923. Its creation was part of a public works programme instigated by the city to try and address the post-war crisis of mass-unemployment; at its outset, the construction of the park was expected to provide work to 140 men for two years. Construction itself began in 1924, and Eaton Park was opened to the public in 1928 by the Prince of Wales, later Edward VIII. It featured pleasure gardens, a restaurant, a yacht pond, and facilities for the playing of cricket, tennis, bowls, football and hockey.

In the 1990s, facilities were added to allow for American football to be played.

== Facilities ==
Current attractions include a boat pond, crazy golf, a children's playground, a skate park, padel and tennis courts, a putting green and bowling facilities. The park is also home to a formal rose garden and a lily pond. A bandstand surrounded by four pavilions, known as the Rotunda, lies in the centre of the park. The pavilions house a café, changing rooms, toilets and park run and tennis clubs. The bandstand hosts concerts and other events throughout the summer.
