= Vengaboys discography =

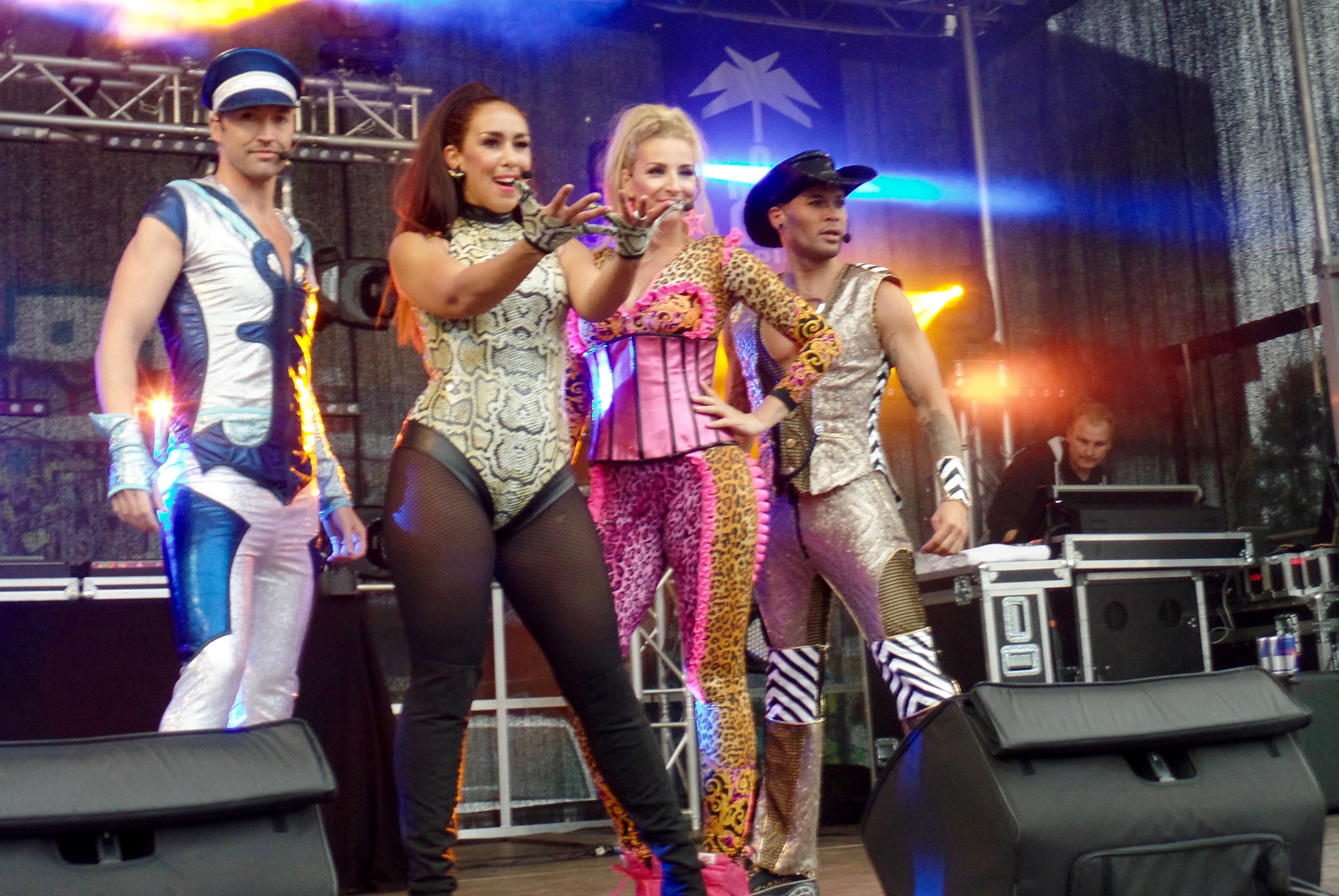
- Vengaboys (2016)
- Studio albums: 2
- Compilation albums: 5
- Singles: 21
- Music videos: 17
- Remix albums: 2

The discography of the Vengaboys, a Dutch Eurodance pop group, consists of two studio albums, twenty-one singles and fifteen music videos. The first release was the group's debut album Up & Down – The Party Album in 1998 for the Dutch market. This was released internationally as The Party Album in 1999.

The group's second album,The Platinum Album, was released in 2000. After that release, the band went on a hiatus before returning in 2011 with new material and their second compilation album The Best of Vengaboys.

== Albums ==
=== Studio albums ===
List of studio albums, with selected chart positions and certifications
Title	Album details	Peak chart positions											Certifications
Title	Album details	NL	AUS	AUT	BEL	CAN	GER	IRE	NZ	SWI	UK	US	Certifications
Up & Down – The Party Album	Released: April 1998; Label: Breakin'; Format: CD, digital download, cassette	4	not released		11	not released							NVPI: Gold
The Party Album	Released: 4 June 1999; Label: Strictly Rhythm, Jive; Format: CD, digital download, cassette	—N/a	4	26	—N/a	5	18	39	5	26	6	86	ARIA: 2× Platinum; BPI: 2× Platinum; CRIA: 3× Platinum; RIAA: Gold; RMNZ: 5× Platinum; IFPI SWI: Gold
The Platinum Album	Released: 13 March 2000; Label: Strictly Rhythm, Jive; Format: CD, digital download, cassette	2	20	2	5	12	4	3	1	2	9	—	ARIA: Platinum; BPI: Gold; CRIA: Gold
"—" denotes studio album that did not chart or was not released in that territory.

=== Compilation albums ===
List of compilation albums, with selected chart positions and certifications
Title	Album details	Peak chart positions		Certifications
Title	Album details	NL	BEL	Certifications
Greatest Hits! Part 1	Released: October 1998; Label: Breakin' Records; Format: CD, cassette, digital download	1	3	NVPI: Platinum; BEA: Platinum; ZPAV: Gold
Greatest Hits	Released: 2009; Label: Breakin' Records; Format: Digital download	—	—	
The Best of Vengaboys	Released: 2011 (Australia only); Label: Central Station; Format: 2×CD, digital download	—N/a		
Best Of!	Released: 2014 (Poland only); Label: Magic Records, Universal Music Poland; Format: CD, digital download	—N/a		
Back to 1999	Released: 2022; Label: Breakin' Records; Format: CD, LP digital download	—	—	
We Like to Party: The Greatest Hits Collection	Released: July 2024; Label: Format: CD, LP	22	58	
"—" denotes compilation album that did not chart or was not released in that territory.

=== Remix albums ===
List of remix albums
Title	Album details
The Remix Album	Released: January 2000; Label: Breakin' Records; Format: CD, digital download
Xmas Party Album	Released: 24 November 2014; Label: Breakin' Records; Format: CD, digital download

== Extended plays ==
Title	Extended play details
Unplugged #1's	Released: 28 June 2019; Label: Breakin' Records/Violent Music BV; Format: Digital download

== Singles ==
List of singles, with selected chart positions and certifications, showing year released and album name
Title	Year	Peak chart positions											Certifications	Album
Title	Year	NL	AUS	AUT	BEL	GER	IRE	NZ	SWE	SWI	UK	US	Certifications	Album
"Parada de Tettas"	1997	29	—	—	—	—	—	—	—	—	—	—		Up & Down – The Party Album
"To Brazil!"	1997	22	—	—	—	—	—	—	—	—	—	—		Up & Down – The Party Album
"Up & Down"	1998	5	55	24	11	12	3	27	—	32	4	—	BPI: Platinum	Up & Down – The Party Album
"We Like to Party (The Vengabus)"	1998	2	2	6	1	4	3	9	56	4	3	26	NVPI: Platinum; ARIA: Platinum; BPI: Platinum; RMNZ: Gold; BEA: Platinum	Up & Down – The Party Album
"Boom, Boom, Boom, Boom!!"	1999	1	2	8	1	6	7	1	1	13	1	84	NVPI: 2× Platinum; ARIA: Platinum; BVMI: Gold; BPI: 2× Platinum; IFPI SWE: 2× Platinum; RMNZ: Platinum; SNEP: Gold; IFPI DEN: Gold; BEA: Platinum	Greatest Hits! Part 1 / The Party Album!
"We're Going to Ibiza!"	1999	1	26	12	2	9	9	6	2	7	1	—	NVPI: Platinum; ARIA: Gold; BPI: Platinum; BEA: Platinum; RMNZ: Gold; IFPI SWE: Platinum	Greatest Hits! Part 1 / The Party Album!
"Kiss (When the Sun Don't Shine)"	1999	2	17	14	5	10	3	1	3	14	3	—	BPI: Silver; IFPI SWE: Gold; RMNZ: Gold	The Platinum Album
"Shalala Lala"	2000	2	4	2	2	3	4	1	5	3	5	—	ARIA: Gold; BVMI: Platinum; BPI: Silver; IFPI SWI: Gold; IFPI SWE: Gold; RMNZ: 3× Platinum; BEA: Gold; IFPI AUS: Platinum	The Platinum Album
"Uncle John from Jamaica"	2000	7	45	10	14	12	11	5	12	18	6	—	RMNZ: Gold	The Platinum Album
"Cheekah Bow Bow (That Computer Song)" (featuring Cheekah)	2000	32	—	30	30	34	35	—	33	49	19	—		The Platinum Album
"Forever as One"	2001	42	—	—	—	79	—	—	—	—	28	—		The Platinum Album
"Rocket to Uranus" (featuring Perez Hilton)	2010	21	—	—	—	—	—	—	—	—	—	—		The Best of Vengaboys
"Hot, Hot, Hot"	2013	29	—	—	87	—	—	—	—	—	—	—		Non-album singles
"2 Brazil!" (re-release)	2014	44	—	—	89	—	—	—	—	—	—	—		Non-album singles
"Where Did My Xmas Tree Go"	2014	—	—	—	—	—	—	—	—	—	—	—		Xmas Party Album
"Supergeil" (with Coen and Sander)	2016	63	—	—	—	—	—	—	—	—	—	—		Non-album singles
"The Sign" (featuring R.I.O.)	2017	—	—	—	—	—	—	—	—	—	—	—		Non-album singles
"Up & Down" (with Timmy Trumpet)	2020	—	—	—	—	—	—	—	—	—	—	—		Non-album singles
"1999 (I Wanna Go Back)"	2021	—	—	—	—	—	—	—	—	—	—	—		Back to 1999
"Boom Boom Boom Boom!!" (with Willy William)	2023	—	—	—	—	—	—	—	—	—	—	—		Non-album single
"—" denotes a recording that did not chart or was not released in that territory.

=== Promotional singles ===
List of singles, with selected chart positions, showing year released and album name
Title	Year	Peak chart positions		Album
Title	Year	GER	SWI	Album
"Megamix"	1999	55	82	The Remix Album

== Music videos ==
Year	Title	Director(s)
1997	"Parada de Tettas"	
1998	"To Brazil!"	
1998	"Up & Down"	Wendelien van Diepen
1998	"We Like to Party (The Vengabus)"	Wendelien van Diepen
1999	"Boom, Boom, Boom, Boom"	
1999	"We're Going to Ibiza"	
1999	"Kiss (When the Sun Don't Shine)"	Masashi Muto
2000	"Shalala Lala"	
2000	"Uncle John from Jamaica"	
2000	"Cheekah Bow Bow (That Computer Song)" (featuring Cheekah)	
2001	"Forever as One"	
2010	"Rocket to Uranus" (featuring Perez Hilton)	Andy Soup
2013	"Hot, Hot, Hot"	Ivo de Jongh
2014	"2 Brazil"	Ine & Sanne
2014	"Where Did My Xmas Tree Go"	
2020	"Up & Down" (with Timmy Trumpet)	
2021	"1999 (I Wanna Go Back)"	
2022	"We Like to Party (The Vengabus)" Silent version	
