= The Remix Album (Vengaboys album) =

Remix album by Vengaboys
- Released: 2000
- Genre: Eurodance
- Label: Breakin', Virgin, Avex Trax

Vengaboys chronology
The Party Album (1999)	The Remix Album (2000)	The Platinum Album (2000)

Professional ratings
Review scores
Source	Rating
Allmusic	2.5/5 stars

The Remix Album is an album released by techno/electronica group, the Vengaboys in 2000.

== Track listing ==
1. "We're Going to Ibiza! (Hitclub Airplay)"
2. "We Like to Party (More Airplay)"
3. "Boom, Boom, Boom, Boom!! (XXL Version)"
4. "Up and Down (Video Mix)"
5. "Ho Ho Vengaboys (XXL Version)"
6. "To Brazil! (XXL)"
7. "Vengababes from Outer Space"
8. "We're Going to Ibiza! (Hit Radio Mix)"
9. "Parada de Tettas (Radio XL)"
10. "Vengaboys Megamix '99 (Edit)"
11. "We Like to Party! (Jason Nevins RMX)"
12. "Up and Down (Airplay XXL)"
13. "We're Going to Ibiza! (Hitclub Extended Mix)"
14. "We Like to Party (DJ Vanhaze Hitmix)"
15. "Vengaboys Megamix '99 (Full Length Version)"
