= Up and Down =

Up and Down, or variants, may refer to:

- Up and down, relative vertical directions

== Film ==
- Up and Down (1965 film), an Italian film
- Up and Down (2004 film), a Czech film
- Up & Down: Mukalil Oralundu, a 2013 Indian Malayalam-language film

== Music ==
=== Albums ===
- Up & Down (Horace Parlan album) or the title track, 1963
- Up and Down (Opus album) or the title song, 1984
- Up and Down (Liane Carroll album), 2011
- Up & Down – The Party Album, by Vengaboys, or the title song (see below), 1998
- Up and Down, an EP by She Wants Revenge, 2009

=== Songs ===
- "Up & Down" (Eddy Huntington song), 1987
- "Up & Down" (EXID song), 2014
- "Up and Down" (Vengaboys song), 1998
- "Up & Down (In & Out)", by Deborah Cox, 2002
- "Up n' Down", by Britney Spears from Femme Fatale, 2011
- "Up and Down", by the Cars from Panorama, 1980
- "Up and Down", by Doja Cat from Planet Her, 2021
- "Up and Down", by Duane Eddy, 1958
- "Up n Down", by Eunhyuk from Explorer, 2025
- "Up and Down", by Eyes of Blue, 1966
- "Up and Down", by the High, 1990
- "Up and Down", by John Fred, 1967
- "Up and Down", by the McCoys, 1966
- "Up and Down", by Pet Shop Boys from the single "Did You See Me Coming?", 2009
- "Up and Down", by Peter Combe from Songs for Little Kids, 1982
- "Up and Down", by the Shoes, 1974
- "Up and Down", from Sesame Street, 1970
- "Up/Down", by Jessica Mauboy, 2008
- "Up Down" (Morgan Wallen song), 2017
- "Up Down (Do This All Day)", by T-Pain, 2013

== Television ==
- "Up & Down", an episode of the TV series Pocoyo

== Other uses ==
- Up and Down (Goya), a 1799 engraving by Francisco de Goya
- Up and down (rail directions)
- Up'n Down, a 1983 arcade game
- Up and down, a traveling violation in basketball

== See also ==
- Ups and Downs (disambiguation)
