= Kim Sasabone =

Dutch singer (born 1976)

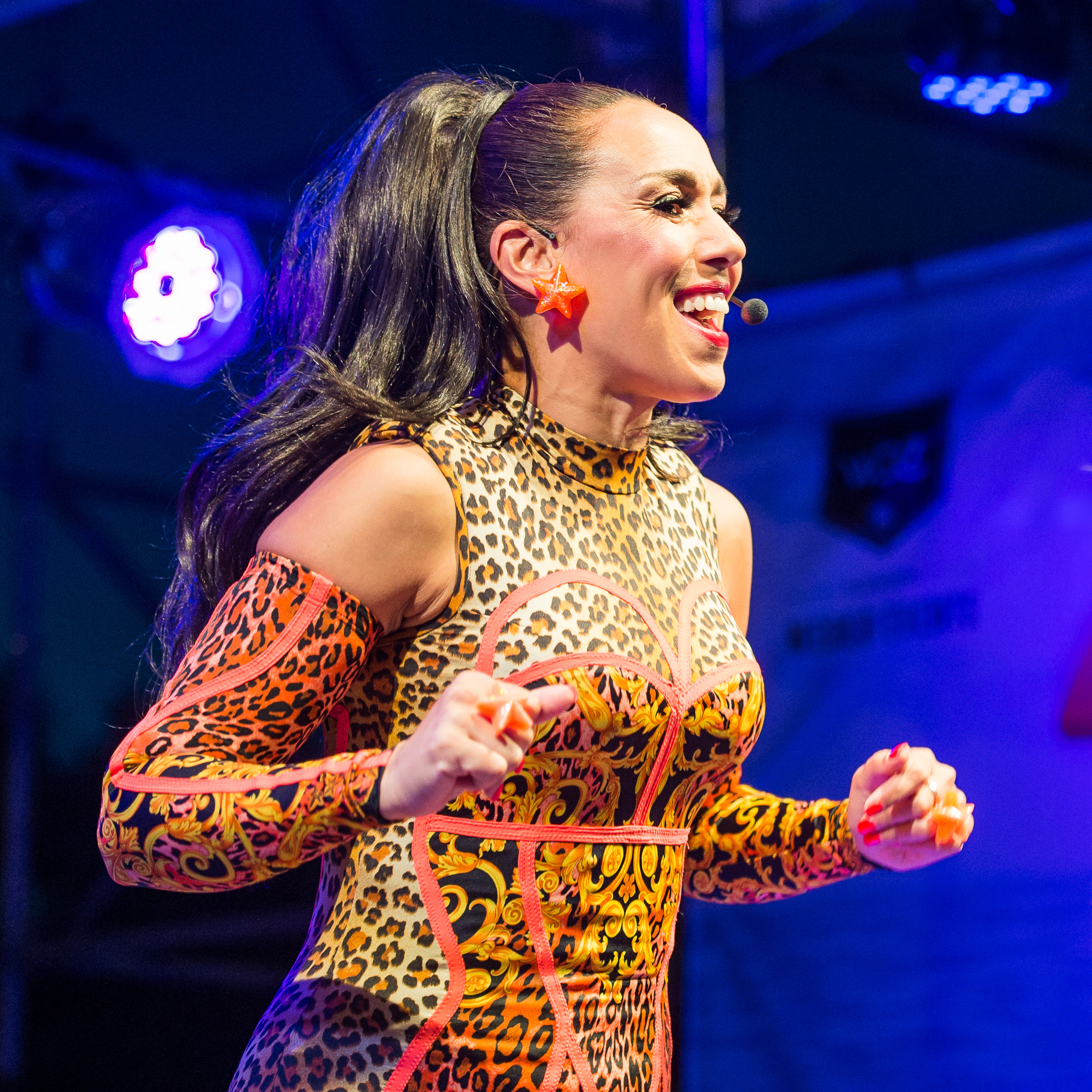
- Sasabone performing in 2016

Background information
- Born: 1 April 1976 (age 50); The Netherlands
- Genres: Pop; dance; Eurodance
- Instrument: Vocals
- Years active: 1997–present
- Member of: Vengaboys
- Spouse: Nick Kazemian

Kim Sasabone (born 1 April 1976) is a Dutch singer, best known for being the lead singer of the Vengaboys.

== Biography ==
Sasabone was born in the Netherlands in 1976.

In 1997, Sasabone joined the Eurodance group Vengaboys. She can be seen and heard as a singer in the video clip of the song "Parada de Tettas", the first single by the Vengaboys.

As a member of the Vengaboys she made her national and international breakthrough in 1998 with the song "Up and Down". In the Netherlands it reached fifth place in the Dutch Top 40. In the United Kingdom the song reached fourth place.

The group achieved real international success a year later with the songs "Boom, Boom, Boom, Boom!!" and "We're going to Ibiza". Both songs reached number one in the charts in the United Kingdom, among other countries. On both songs, Sasabone was the lead singer.

In 2011, Sasabone opened the Rotterdam branch of The Bootcamp Club.

In December 2024, she announced that she would be taking a break from music to rest. She was replaced on the rest of their tour by Cilla Niekoop from Ch!pz.

== Personal life ==
Sasabone is of Moluccan descent. She is married to DJ Nick Kazemian. In 2013, she gave birth to a son.
