= Walt Disney Christmas Show =

Television special program

- Directed by: Robert Florey
- Country of origin: United States
- Original language: English

Production
- Executive producer: Bill Walsh
- Running time: 1 hour
- Production company: Walt Disney Productions

Original release
- Network: CBS
- Release: December 25, 1951

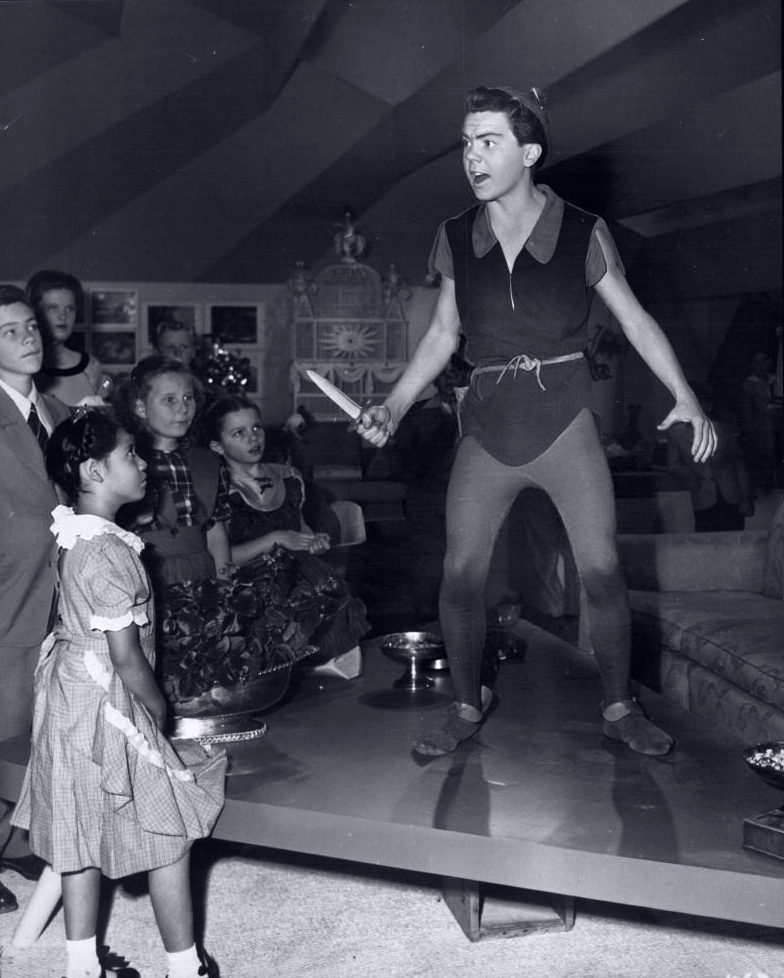
Bobby Driscoll as Peter Pan in the special

The Walt Disney Christmas Show was a television special that aired on December 25, 1951. It served as an advertisement for Disney's 1953 film Peter Pan as well as the 1952 rerelease of Snow White and the Seven Dwarfs. It was sponsored by Johnson & Johnson and aired on CBS.

== Synopsis ==
After a short salute to doctors, nurses and other in the healthcare industry from Johnson and Johnson, the credits roll on printed pages and then the Magic Mirror greets the audience and segues to a Christmas party at Walt Disney Studios. Walt Disney is shown displaying sketches for the upcoming Peter Pan film. Then Kathryn Beaumont and Bobby Driscoll are introduced as Wendy Darling and Peter Pan, respectively. Wendy then asks the Magic Mirror to play a Mickey Mouse cartoon. He obliges, playing the 1935 short The Band Concert. Then the Mirror is requested to play a clip of Snow White by children in different languages. After some goading by Wendy and Peter, doubting his ability, the Mirror plays a clip of Snow White in 10 languages - English, Czech, Danish, Dutch, French, Italian, Polish, Portuguese, Spanish, and Swedish. The Mirror then announces that the audience will be able to watch the whole film in English and in Technicolor after the turn of the year.

An Indian girl asks the mirror for something in the Hindustani language. After some hesitation, the mirror obliges with an excerpt of Bambi in Hindustani, accompanied with Indian music. After this the Mirror introduces his wife's nephew, Willoughby, who is trying to break into the "magic mirror business" and introduces a Donald Duck cartoon. Finally, Bobby Driscoll as Peter Pan requests a segment from Song of the South.

== Segments ==
- The Band Concert - 1935 Mick Mouse short
- Seven Dwarves' Party for Snow White from Snow White and the Seven Dwarfs, in 10 languages - 1937
- An excerpt from Bambi in Hindustani with Indian music - 1942
- Donald and Pluto - 1935 Donald Duck short
- Br'er Rabbit Runs Away from Song of the South - 1946

== Cast ==
- Walt Disney - himself, Mickey
- Bobby Driscoll - himself, Peter Pan
- Kathryn Beaumont - herself, Wendy Darlin
- Hans Conried - Magic Mirror
- Bill Thompson - Willoughby
- Don Barclay - Dr. Miller, Santa Claus
- Tommy Luske - Michael Darling
- Paul Collins - John Darling
