= Barbados (Typically Tropical song) =

Single by Typically Tropical

from the album Barbados Sky
- B-side: "Sandy"
- Released: 23 May 1975
- Recorded: 1975
- Studio: Morgan Studios, London
- Genre: Pop; cod reggae
- Length: 3:44
- Label: Gull
- Songwriters: Jeffrey Calvert; Max West
- Producers: Jeffrey Calvert; Max West

Typically Tropical singles chronology
"Barbados" (1975)	"Rocket Now" (1975)

"Barbados" is the debut single by British band Typically Tropical, released in May 1975.

== Inspiration and writing ==
Jef Calvert was asked by his father, a travelling musician, to join him on a cruise tour of the Caribbean, including Barbados.

After returning to the UK, Calvert wrote the song with Geraint Hughes (credited as Max West). They were both audio engineers at Trojan Records and recorded the song in the studio after hours. With Hughes on keys and Calvert on guitar, the song has four chords, the only four chords Calvert knew.

The lead vocals on the song are by Calvert, who sang with a patois twange in his voice, which the two picked up working with the reggae artists who were signed to Trojan.

== Reception ==
"Barbados" entered the UK Singles Chart at number 37 in late June 1975, and five weeks later it hit number one for a week. In total, "Barbados" spent eleven weeks on the chart. The track also reached number one on the Irish Singles Chart, the South African Singles Chart, and number 20 on the Australian Singles Chart (Kent Music Report). The track was later released on an album in 1975 by Gull Records, named Barbados Sky.

Follow-up singles "Rocket Now" and "The Ghost Song" failed to chart, leaving Typically Tropical as a one-hit wonder.

In 1999, a reworked version of the song, renamed "We're Going to Ibiza", also reached the UK number one spot for the Vengaboys.

== Charts ==
Chart (1975)	Peak position
Australia (Kent Music Report)	20
Belgium (Ultratop 50 Flanders)	17
Belgium (Ultratop 50 Wallonia)	32
Denmark (IFPI)	4
Germany (GfK)	8
Ireland (IRMA)	1
Netherlands (Dutch Top 40)	10
Netherlands (Single Top 100)	11
New Zealand (Recorded Music NZ)	5
Norway (VG-lista)	6
South Africa (Springbok Radio)	1
Sweden (Sverigetopplistan)	11
UK Singles (Official Charts)	1
US Bubbling Under the Hot 100 (Billboard)	108

== See also ==
- List of number-one singles from the 1970s (UK)
- List of number-one singles of 1975 (Ireland)
