= List of number-one singles of 1975 (Ireland) =

This is a list of singles which have reached number one on the Irish Singles Chart in 1975.

| Issue date | Song | Artist | Ref. |
|---|---|---|---|
| 2 January | "Lonely This Christmas" | Mud | |
| 9 January | "Lonely This Christmas" | Mud | |
| 16 January | "Streets Of London" | Ralph McTell | |
| 23 January | "Streets Of London" | Ralph McTell | |
| 30 January | "Ms Grace" | The Tymes | |
| 6 February | "January" | Pilot | |
| 13 February | "January" | Pilot | |
| 20 February | "January" | Pilot | |
| 27 February | "January" | Pilot | |
| 6 March | "Make Me Smile (Come Up and See Me)" | Steve Harley & Cockney Rebel | |
| 13 March | "Make Me Smile (Come Up and See Me)" | Steve Harley & Cockney Rebel | |
| 20 March | "If" | Telly Savalas | |
| 27 March | "Bye Bye Baby" | Bay City Rollers | |
| 3 April | "Bye Bye Baby" | Bay City Rollers | |
| 10 April | "Bye Bye Baby" | Bay City Rollers | |
| 17 April | "Bye Bye Baby" | Bay City Rollers | |
| 24 April | "Love Is All" | Red Hurley | |
| 1 May | "Love Is All" | Red Hurley | |
| 8 May | "Oh Boy" | Mud | |
| 15 May | "Oh Boy" | Mud | |
| 22 May | "Oh Boy" | Mud | |
| 29 May | "Stand by Your Man" | Tammy Wynette | |
| 5 June | "Stand by Your Man" | Tammy Wynette | |
| 12 June | "Stand by Your Man" | Tammy Wynette | |
| 19 June | "Three Steps To Heaven" | Showaddywaddy | |
| 26 June | "The Proud One" | The Osmonds | |
| 3 July | "I'm Not in Love" | 10cc | |
| 10 July | "I'm Not in Love" | 10cc | |
| 17 July | "Tears on My Pillow" | Johnny Nash | |
| 24 July | "Tears on My Pillow" | Johnny Nash | |
| 31 July | "Give a Little Love" | Bay City Rollers | |
| 7 August | "Give a Little Love" | Bay City Rollers | |
| 14 August | "Barbados" | Typically Tropical | |
| 21 August | "Barbados" | Typically Tropical | |
| 28 August | "Can't Give You Anything (But My Love)" | The Stylistics | |
| 4 September | "Can't Give You Anything (But My Love)" | The Stylistics | |
| 11 September | "Can't Give You Anything (But My Love)" | The Stylistics | |
| 18 September | "Can't Give You Anything (But My Love)" | The Stylistics | |
| 25 September | "Sailing" | Rod Stewart | |
| 2 October | "Moonlighting" | Leo Sayer | |
| 9 October | "Hold Me Close" | David Essex | |
| 16 October | "Hold Me Close" | David Essex | |
| 23 October | "Rhinestone Cowboy" | Glen Campbell | |
| 30 October | "Rhinestone Cowboy" | Glen Campbell | |
| 6 November | "Rhinestone Cowboy" | Glen Campbell | |
| 13 November | "Rhinestone Cowboy" | Glen Campbell | |
| 20 November | "Rhinestone Cowboy" | Glen Campbell | |
| 27 November | "Rhinestone Cowboy" | Glen Campbell | |
| 4 December | "The Combine Harvester" | Brendan Grace | |
| 11 December | "Imagine" | John Lennon | |
| 18 December | "Bohemian Rhapsody" | Queen | |
| 25 December | "Bohemian Rhapsody" | Queen | |

== See also ==
- 1975 in music
- Irish Singles Chart
- List of artists who reached number one in Ireland
