= Megamix (disambiguation) =

A megamix is a medley remix containing multiple songs in rapid succession.

Megamix may also refer to:

== Music ==
=== Albums ===
- Megamix (Big Boy album), 1999
- Megamix, by Mate Bulić, 2004
- The MegaMix, by Lil Suzy, 1999

=== Songs ===
- "Megamix" (1988 Boney M. song)
- "Mega Mix" (1992 Boney M. song)
- "Megamix" (Gloria Estefan song), 1992
- "Megamix" (R.I.O. song), 2013
- "Mega Mix" (Snap! song), 1991
- "Megamix" (Technotronic song), 1990
- "Megamix" (Vengaboys song), 2000
- "Megamix" (Basshunter song), 2008
- "Mega-Mix", by Herbie Hancock
- "Megamix '93", a song by Luv', 1993
- "Janet Megamix 04", a song by Janet Jackson, 2003
- "Chris Cox Megamix", a song by Britney Spears from Greatest Hits: My Prerogative
- "Westlife Megamix", a song by Westlife from Coast to Coast

== Video games ==
- Dancing Stage MegaMix, a game in the Dance Dance Revolution series
- Fighters Megamix, a video game produced by AM2
- Rhythm Heaven Megamix, the fourth entry in the Rhythm Heaven series
- Hatsune Miku: Project Diva Mega Mix, the eighth entry in the Hatsune Miku: Project Diva series

== Other uses ==
- MegaMix, a version of the Vorbis audio encoder

== See also ==
- Megaminx
