= I Lost My Heart to a Starship Trooper =

Single by Sarah Brightman and Hot Gossip
- B-side: "Do, Do, Do"
- Released: 1978
- Recorded: 1978
- Genre: Pop, disco, space disco
- Length: 3:42; 4:19 (long version)
- Label: Ariola Hansa
- Songwriters: Jeff Calvert, Geraint Hughes
- Producer: Steve Rowland

"I Lost My Heart to a Starship Trooper", sometimes cited as "(I Lost My Heart to A) Starship Trooper", is a 1978 single written by Jeff Calvert and Max West of Typically Tropical and performed by Sarah Brightman and the dance troupe Hot Gossip. It was the debut of the 18-year-old Brightman and reached number six on the UK singles chart.

== Background and release ==
The song is a space disco track, released amid the popularity of the original Star Wars film. The lyrics include the lines "And evil Darth Vader, he's been banished to Mars" and "Or are you like a droid, devoid of emotion". Other science fiction references include: "I lost my heart to a starship trooper", "Flash Gordon's left me, he's gone to the stars", "What my body needs is close encounter three", "Static on the comm – it's Starfleet Command" and "Fighting for the Federation".

The song uses musical themes from Star Wars, Thus Spoke Zarathustra (from 2001: A Space Odyssey), and the "spaceship communication" melody from Close Encounters of the Third Kind.

The song was performed on The Kenny Everett Video Show by its regular dance troupe Hot Gossip. Its lead, Sarah Brightman, was dressed in a silver catsuit and black thigh-high boots.

In 1997, Brightman rerecorded the song, with producer Frank Peterson, and released it as a single to coincide with the film Starship Troopers. Although the single carried artwork from the film, the song itself was not in the film.

== Charts ==
Weekly charts for "I Lost My Heart to a Starship Trooper"
Chart (1978)	Peak Position
Ireland (IRMA)	5
Netherlands (Single Top 100)	50
UK Singles (OCC)	6
West Germany (GfK)	26

== Certifications ==
Region	Certification	Certified units/sales
United Kingdom (BPI)	Gold	500,000^{^}
^{^} Shipments figures based on certification alone.
