= Ups and Downs =

Ups and Downs or The Ups and Downs may refer to:

== Music ==
- "Ups & Downs", a 2005 song by Snoop Dogg
- "Ups & Downs", a song by 213 from The Hard Way
- Ups and Downs (band), Australian band
- Ups 'n Downs (album), a 1973 album by Bud Powell
- The Ups and Downs (album), a 1985 album by Stephen Duffy (as Stephen "Tin Tin" Duffy)
- Ups & Downs: Early Recordings and B-Sides, a compilation album by Saves the Day
- "Ups and Downs", a 1967 song by Paul Revere & the Raiders

== Film and television ==
- The Ups and Downs (1914 film), a short film starring Wallace Beery and Charles J. Stine
- Ups and Downs (1915 film), a film featuring Oliver Hardy
- Ups and Downs (1937 film), a short musical
- Ups and Downs (1983 film), a Canadian drama film
- Ups and Downs (2000 TV series), a Hong Kong program featuring Patricia Liu
- The Ups and Downs of a Handyman, a 1975 British comedy film

== Other ==
- The 69th Regiment of Foot, nicknamed the Ups and Downs

== See also ==
- Up and Down (disambiguation)
