= Christmas Party =

Christmas Party or Xmas Party may refer to:

- A party, held to celebrate Christmas

== Christmas Party ==
=== Films ===
- The Christmas Party (film), a 1996 Finnish crime comedy film

=== Music ===
- Xmas Party Album, a 2014 album by the Vengaboys
- Christmas Party (The Monkees album) or the title track, 2018
- Christmas Party (RuPaul album) or the title song, 2018
- Christmas Party (She & Him album), 2016
- Christmas Party, an album by the Kelly Family, 2022
- "Christmas Party", a song by Eraserheads from Fruitcake, 1996
- "Christmas Party", a song by Megan Trainor from A Very Trainor Christmas, 2020

=== Literature ===
- The Christmas Party (play), a 1724 play by Ludvig Holberg
- "Christmas Party" (short story), a 1957 Nero Wolfe novella by Rex Stout

=== Television ===
- "Christmas Party" (Nero Wolfe episode), a 2001 adaptation of the novella
- "Christmas Party" (The Office), a 2005 episode of the U.S. series
- "Xmas Party", a 2008 episode of The Inbetweeners
- The Christmas Party, a 1997–2003 Cartoon Network programming block

== See also ==
- Office Christmas Party, a 2016 comedy film
