= The Party Album (Vengaboys album) =

Studio album (reissue) by Vengaboys
- Released: 4 June 1999
- Genres: Eurodance, Trance
- Labels: Breakin', Jive, Positiva, Groovilicious, Avex Trax
- Producer: Vengaboys

Vengaboys chronology
Greatest Hits! Part 1 (1998)	The Party Album (1999)	The Remix Album (1999)

Singles from The Party Album
- 1. "Up and Down" Released: February 1998; 2. "We Like to Party (The Vengabus)" Released: May 1998; 3. "Boom, Boom, Boom, Boom!!" Released: October 1998; 4. "We're Going to Ibiza" Released: March 1999

Professional ratings
Review scores
Source	Rating
AllMusic	3/5 stars
Robert Christgau	(dud)

The Party Album (stylized as The Party Album!) is the international debut album by Dutch dance group Vengaboys. The standard version is the same track-listing as Greatest Hits! Part 1.

== Content ==
Four singles were released internationally from The Party Album: "Up & Down" "We Like to Party (The Vengabus)", "Boom, Boom, Boom, Boom!!" and "We're Going to Ibiza". The album includes two previously Benelux released singles "Parada de Tettas" and "To Brazil!". Entertainment Daily lists "We're Going to Ibiza" as their sixth and final single of this album.

== Track listings ==
The Party Album! – Australia & New Zealand version
No.	Title	Writer(s)	Length
1.	"We Like to Party (The Vengabus)"	Danski, DJ Delmundo	3:41
2.	"Boom, Boom, Boom, Boom!!"	Danski, DJ Delmundo	3:22
3.	"Ho Ho Vengaboys"	Pronti and Kalmani	3:40
4.	"Up and Down"	Danski, DJ Delmundo	4:03
5.	"We're Going to Ibiza"	Geraint Hughes, Jeffrey Calvert, Danski, DJ Delmundo	3:09
6.	"Parada de Tettas"	Danski, DJ Delmundo	4:04
7.	"To Brazil!"	Jorge Lima Menezes, Ary Barroso, Danski, DJ Delmundo	3:06
8.	"Movin' Around"	Pronti and Kalmani	3:48
9.	"You & Me"	Aircheck	5:24
10.	"The Vengabeat"	Danski, DJ Delmundo	4:09
11.	"Paradise..."	Danski, DJ Delmundo	7:06
12.	"Superfly Slick Dick"	Danski, DJ Delmundo	5:20
13.	"All Night Passion"	Aircheck	3:42
14.	"24 Hours"	Danski, DJ Delmundo	6:39
15.	"Vengababes from Outer Space" (Australian exclusive)	Danski, DJ Delmundo	3:25
16.	"Nick Skitz Vengaboy Megamix" (Australian exclusive)		7:09
17.	"We Like to Party" (Jason Nevins clubmix)	Danski, DJ Delmundo	6:15

The Party Album! – UK standard version
No.	Title	Length
1.	"We Like to Party! (The Vengabus)"	3:41
2.	"Boom, Boom, Boom, Boom!!"	3:22
3.	"Up and Down"	3:59
4.	"Ho Ho Vengaboys!"	3:41
5.	"To Brazil!"	3:07
6.	"We're Going to Ibiza"	3:38
7.	"Vengababes from Outer Space"	3:26
8.	"Superfly Slick"	5:21
9.	"Movin' Around"	3:48
10.	"The Vengabeat"	4:09
11.	"You and Me"	5:24
12.	"Paradise..."	7:07

== Charts ==
=== Weekly charts ===
Chart (1999–2000)	Peak position
Australian Albums (ARIA)	4
Austrian Albums (Ö3 Austria)	26
Danish Albums (Hitlisten)	5
Finnish Albums (Suomen virallinen lista)	9
French Albums (SNEP)	22
German Albums (Offizielle Top 100)	18
Hungarian Albums (MAHASZ)	2
Malaysian Albums (RIM)	1
New Zealand Albums (RMNZ)	5
Norwegian Albums (VG-lista)	6
Portuguese Albums Chart	1
Swedish Albums (Sverigetopplistan)	7
Spanish Albums Chart	11
Scottish Albums (Official Charts)	4
Swiss Albums (Schweizer Hitparade)	26
UK Albums (Official Charts)	6
US Billboard 200	86

=== Year-end charts ===
Chart (1999)	Position
Australian Albums (ARIA)	20
German Albums (Offizielle Top 100)	42
New Zealand Albums (RMNZ)	13
UK Albums (OCC)	20

Chart (2000)	Position
Canadian Albums (Nielsen SoundScan)	155
New Zealand Albums (RMNZ)	36

== Certifications and sales ==
Region	Certification	Certified units/sales
Australia (ARIA)	2× Platinum	140,000^{^}
Canada (Music Canada)	3× Platinum	300,000^{^}
Chile (IFPI)	—	73,911
Denmark (IFPI Danmark)	Platinum	50,000^{^}
France (SNEP)	Gold	100,000^{*}
India	—	650,000
New Zealand (RMNZ)	5× Platinum	75,000^{^}
Norway (IFPI Norway)	Gold	25,000^{*}
Spain (Promusicae)	Gold	50,000^{^}
Sweden (GLF)	Gold	40,000^{^}
Switzerland (IFPI Switzerland)	Gold	25,000^{^}
United Kingdom (BPI)	2× Platinum	600,000^{^}
United States (RIAA)	Gold	500,000^{^}
Summaries
Europe (IFPI)	Platinum	1,000,000^{*}
^{*} Sales figures based on certification alone.^{^} Shipments figures based on certification alone.
