= Barbados Sky =

Studio album by Typically Tropical
- Released: 1975
- Studio: Morgan Studios, London
- Label: Gull Songs
- Producer: Jeffrey Calvert, Max West

Barbados Sky is the first and only LP released by Typically Tropical, released in 1975. It was most famous for its hit single "Barbados". The musicians included top session players Chris Spedding, Roger Coulam, Vic Flick, Joe Moretti, Clem Cattini and Alan Caddy.

== Track listing ==
Side 1

1. "Barbados" (Jeffrey Calvert, Max West)
2. "Hot Summer Girls" (Peter Shelley, Marty Wilde)
3. "The Pied Piper" (Artie Kornfeld, Steve Duboff)
4. "Hole In the Sky" (Calvert, West)
5. "In the Stew" (Calvert)
6. "Sylvan's a Barbadian" (Calvert, West)

Side 2

1. "Sandy" (Calvert, West)
2. "Everybody Plays the Fool" (Rudy Clark, Ken Williams, J.R. Bailey)
3. "Rocket Now" (Calvert, West)
4. "Israelites" (Desmond Dacres, Leslie Kong)
5. "Do the Yam" (West, Chris Tsangarides)

== Personnel ==
- The Hurricane Force Steel Band
- Tobias Wilcock - vocals
- Chris Spedding, Joe Moretti, Kevin Peek, Vic Flick - guitar
- Alan Tarney, Dave Marquee - bass
- Jeffrey Calvert - vocals, producer, engineer
- Max West - keyboards, arrangements, producer
- Roger Coulam - keyboards
- Clem Cattini, Trevor Spencer - drums
- Frank Ricotti - percussion

Technical

- Lindsay Kidd, Martin Levan, Robin Black - engineer
- Chris "Yam" Tsangarides - tape op "tapes and insanity"
- Gull Graphics, John Pasche - sleeve design
