= Megamix (Vengaboys song) =

1999 single by Vengaboys

Single by Vengaboys

from the album The Remix Album
- Released: 1999
- Recorded: 1999
- Genre: Eurodance
- Label: EMI
- Songwriters: Wessel van Diepen, Dennis van den Driesschen
- Producer: Vengaboys

Vengaboys singles chronology
"We're Going to Ibiza" (1999)	"Megamix" (1999)	"Kiss (When the Sun Don't Shine)" (1999)

"Megamix" is a song by the Dutch band Vengaboys released in 1999 from their remix album The Remix Album.

== Track listing ==
1. "Megamix" (Single Edit)
2. "Megamix" (Short Maxi Edit)
3. "Megamix" (Long Maxi Edit)

== Charts ==
Chart (2000)	Peak position
Canada (Nielsen SoundScan)	7
Germany (GfK)	55
Switzerland (Schweizer Hitparade)	82

=== Year-end charts ===
Chart (2001)	Position
Canada (Nielsen SoundScan)	161
