= Up & Down – The Party Album =

Up & Down - The Party Album!

Studio album by Vengaboys
- Released: April 1998
- Recorded: 1997
- Label: Breakin'

Vengaboys chronology
Up & Down - The Party Album! (1998)	Greatest Hits! Part 1 (1998)

Singles from Up & Down
- 1. "Parada de Tettas" Released: August 1997; 2. "To Brazil" Released: 1997; 3. "Up & Down" Released: 27 February 1998; 4. "We Like to Party (The Vengabus)" Released: May 1998

Professional ratings
Review scores
Source	Rating
Allmusic	3/5 stars

Up & Down – The Party Album! is the debut studio album of Dutch dance group Vengaboys. It was released in the Benelux in April 1998 by Breakin' Records. Four singles were released off the album: "Parada de Tettas" and "To Brazil" in 1997, and "Up & Down" and "We Like to Party! (The Vengabus)" in 1998. Up & Down is notable in the Vengaboys catalogue for focusing almost entirely on instrumental trance and club songs. The album would be repackaged later that year as Greatest Hits! Part 1, replacing 8 of the tracks with 10 vocal euro dance songs. Greatest Hits! would be re-issued with slight variations in 1999 as The Party Album.

== Track listing ==
No.	Title	Writer(s)	Length
1.	"Up & Down (More Airplay)"	Danski, DJ Delmundo	3:58
2.	"To Brazil (Medium Radio)"	Ary Barroso, Danski, DJ Delmundo	3:20
3.	"Parada de Tettas"	Danski, DJ Delmundo	4:02
4.	"24 Hours"	Danski, DJ Delmundo	6:39
5.	"We Like to Party!"	Danski, DJ Delmundo	4:04
6.	"Funky Speed"	Danski, DJ Delmundo	4:05
7.	"Cookies"	H.W.A. Schippers	4:50
8.	"I Like the Music Pumpin'"	Schippers	7:00
9.	"Get Down!"	Pronti & Kalmani	5:30
10.	"I Love What Y'r Doing to Me"	Pronti & Kalmani	4:09
11.	"You and Me"	Aircheck	5:25
12.	"All Night Passion"	Aircheck	3:41
13.	"Better World"	Aircheck	5:00
14.	"PDT RMX" (short for "Parada de Tettas Remix")		3:59

== Charts ==
=== Weekly charts ===
Chart (1998)	Peak position
Belgian Albums (Ultratop Flanders)	11
Dutch Albums (Album Top 100)	4

=== Year-end charts ===
Chart (1998)	Position
Dutch Albums (Album Top 100)	45

== Certifications ==
Region	Certification	Certified units/sales
Netherlands (NVPI)	Gold	50,000^{^}
Switzerland (IFPI Switzerland)	Gold	25,000^{^}
^{^} Shipments figures based on certification alone.
