= Up and Down (Goya) =

Etching by Francisco de Goya from the series Los Caprichos

- Subir y bajar (Spanish)
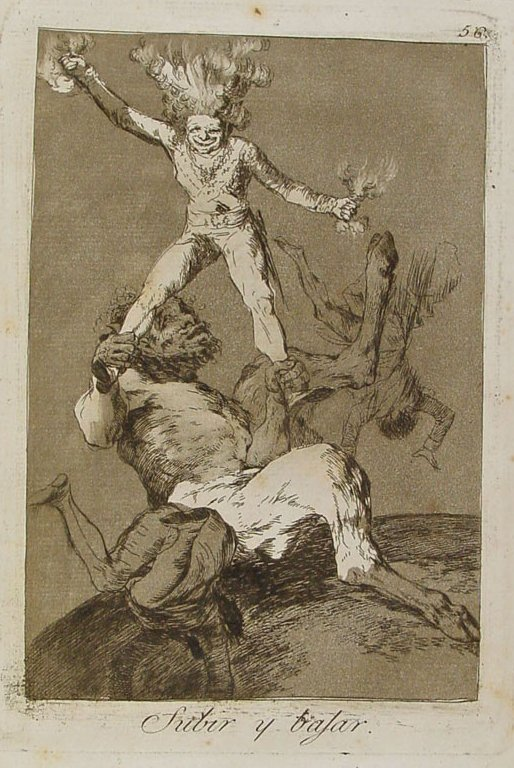
- Artist: Francisco de Goya
- Year: 1799
- Type: Etching and aquatint
- Dimensions: 21.4 cm × 15.1 cm (8.4 in × 5.9 in)
- Location: Museo del Prado

The etching Up and Down (Spanish: Subir y bajar) is an engraving from the series Los Caprichos by the Spanish painter Francisco de Goya. It is numbered 56 in the series of 80 prints and was published in 1799.

== Interpretations ==
Various contemporary manuscripts provide explanations for the plates of Los Caprichos. The manuscript held at the Museo del Prado is considered an autograph by Goya, though it appears to obscure the artist's riskier intentions by offering a moralizing interpretation. Two other manuscripts, one owned by Ayala and another at the National Library of Spain, emphasize the more biting significance of the prints.

Explanation from the Museo del Prado manuscript:
"Fortune treats those who court her very badly. She repays the effort of climbing with smoke, and punishes the one who has risen by casting him down." (La fortuna trata muy mal a quien la obsequia. Paga con humo la fatiga de subir y al que ha subido le castiga con precipitarle.)

Ayala manuscript: "Prince of Peace. (Note: Charles IV of Spain granted Manuel Godoy the title Prince of Peace in 1795 after the signing of the Treaty of Basel, which ended the war against the French First Republic.) Lust lifts him by the feet; it fills his head with smoke and wind, and he hurls lightning at his rivals..." (Príncipe de la Paz. La lujuria le eleva por los pies; se le llena la cabeza de humo y viento, y despide rayos contra sus émulos...)

National Library of Spain manuscript:
"The Prince of Peace, raised by lust and with his head full of smoke, wields lightning (Note: Vibra: "By extension, it means to hurl something with force and violence, especially those things that create vibrations in their movement" (Academia Española, Diccionario de la lengua castellana, Madrid, 1791). Rayo: "Ruin, misfortune, or sudden and unexpected punishment" (Academia Española, Diccionario de la lengua castellana, Madrid, 1791).) against good ministers. They fall, and the wheel turns; such is the story of favorites." (Note: During the reign of Charles IV, Godoy was known as 'the favorite.') (El Príncipe de la Paz levantado por la lujuria, y con la cabeza llena de humo, vibra rayos contra los buenos ministros. Caen estos y rueda la bola; que es la historia de los favoritos.)

== Technique ==
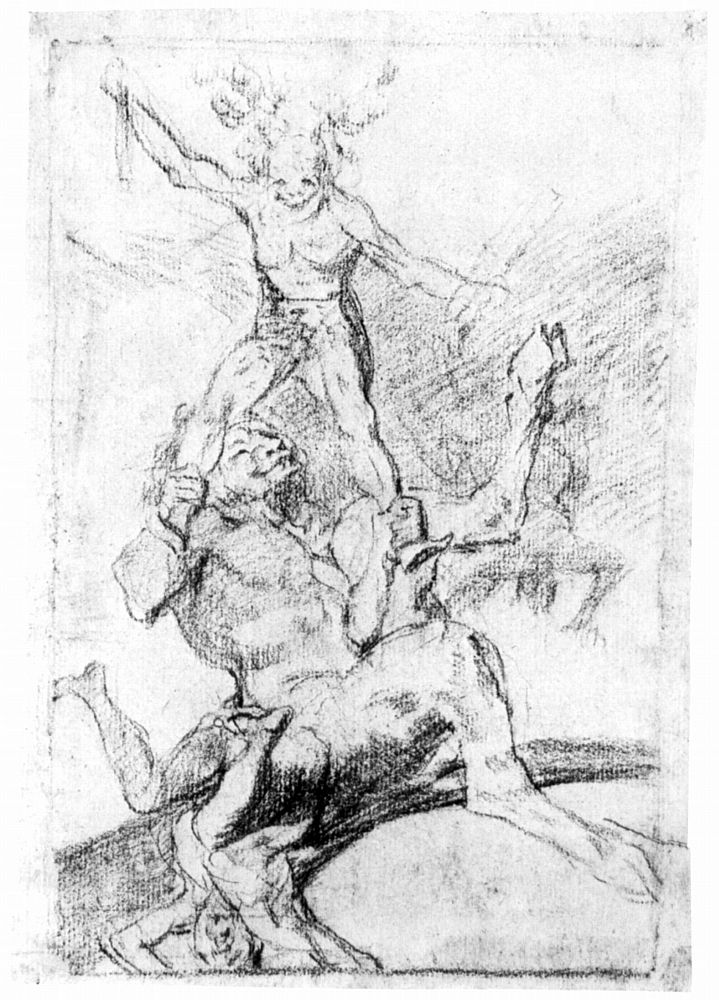
Preparatory drawing

The print measures 214 × 152 mm on a sheet of paper measuring 306 × 201 mm. Goya employed etching and aquatint techniques. The preparatory drawing is executed in sanguine with traces of black pencil and measures 204 × 144 mm.

== Catalogue ==
- Catalogue number G002144 for the print at the Museo del Prado.
- Catalogue number D04221 for the preparatory drawing at the Museo del Prado.
- Catalogue number 51-1-10-56 at the Goya Museum in Castres.

== Bibliography ==
- Camón Aznar, José (1981). Francisco de Goya (in Spanish). Vol. III. Zaragoza: Caja de Ahorros de Zaragoza, Aragón y Rioja. Instituto Camón Aznar. p. 371. ISBN 978-84-500-5016-5.
- Carrete Parrondo, Juan (1994). "Francisco de Goya. Los Caprichos". Goya. Los Caprichos. Dibujos y Aguafuertes (in Spanish). Madrid: Central Hispano. R.A. de Bellas Artes de San Fernando. Calcografía Nacional. ISBN 84-604-9323-7.
- Casariego, Rafael (1988). Francisco de Goya, Los Caprichos (in Spanish). Madrid: Ediciones de arte y bibliofilia. ISBN 84-86630-11-8.
- Barrena, Clemente; Blas, Javier; Matilla, José Manuel; Villar, José Luís; Villena, Elvira (1994). "Dibujos y Estampas". Goya. Los Caprichos. Dibujos y Aguafuertes (in Spanish). Central Hispano. R.A. de Bellas Artes de San Fernando. Calcografía Nacional. ISBN 84-604-9323-7.
- Helman, Edith (1983). Transmundo de Goya (in Spanish). Madrid: Alianza Editorial. p. 238. ISBN 84-206-7032-4.
- Gassier, Pierre; Wilson, Juliet (1970). Vie et Œuvre de Francisco Goya (in French). Fribourg: Office du Livre.
- Sánchez Catón, F.J. (1949). Goya Los Caprichos (in Spanish). Barcelona: Instituto Amatller de Arte Hispánico.
