= Typically Tropical =

British pop music band

- Origin: London
- Genres: Pop, disco
- Years active: 1974–1981
- Label: Gull Records
- Past members: Jeff Calvert; Geraint Hughes

Typically Tropical were a British band comprising two Trojan Records audio engineers, Jeff Calvert and Geraint Hughes (who performed under the stage name "Max West"). They are best known for their 1975 number one hit record "Barbados" and for writing the 1978 disco hit "I Lost My Heart to a Starship Trooper" performed by Sarah Brightman and Hot Gossip.

== History ==
The two men behind Typically Tropical were Jeff Calvert and Geraint Hughes, who both worked as audio engineers for Trojan Records. The story of "Barbados" came after Calvert was asked by his father, a travelling musician who was doing a cruise tour of the Caribbean, if he wanted to come on the journey with him.

After returning to the UK, Calvert decided to write the song "Barbados", after he visited the country during the trip, and teamed up with Geraint Hughes to help him write the song, which was written in Ealing. Calvert and Hughes sneaked into a Trojan studio after hours to record the song. Calvert on guitar and Hughes on keys, the song has four chords, which at the time were the only four chords Jeff knew.

After hearing the demo version of "Barbados", recorded in the spring of 1974, David Howell of Gull Records wanted to hear more, but instead Jeff and Geraint asked for £1500 to finish both "Barbados" and another track they had written, "The Ghost Song", and to record the "Barbados"' B-side, "Sandy". Having agreed, Gull then signed them up for three singles. "Barbados" was finished at the end of 1974, but Gull decided to wait until May 1975 to release it. Geraint Hughes was credited on the release as "Max West". In August that year it reached number one, and the duo, having performed it on Top of the Pops, decided to write another nine songs for the album Barbados Sky, which was released at the same time as the follow-up single "Rocket Now" (backed with "Hole in the Sky"), and sold around 8000 copies.

Opening with "Barbados", the version on the album was slightly different. It began with an additional pre-take-off conversation between Captain Tobias Willcock and Air Traffic Control, whereas the single version begins with the Captain's welcome to his passengers. At the beginning of the single, but not on the album, is the unusual sound of grasshoppers chirruping (which also features at the end of "Rocket Now"), and a dog barking. The album version of the track curtails the single's original ending, fading out earlier.

Originally, the duo’s manager did not want the public to know who they were, to "keep the mystery going", however the identities of the two were soon revealed on the cover of the 28 July 1975 issue of Record Mirror. The photo used of them was of the two standing behind a set of palm trees which was taken outside St John's Wood tube station, as there were a few small palm trees there at the time.

"The Ghost Song" was released as a single in November under the names "Calvert & West" with "Eternity Isle" as the B-side, but as with all their subsequent singles, it did not chart. In May 1976, the third single from the album, "Everybody Plays the Fool", was released. Further singles were released under a variety of names, but also did not chart. The duo's final original single was "Lady D", released in June 1981 on their own label, Whisper, which they had originally set up to release songs by Sarah Brightman (having written the hit "I Lost My Heart to a Starship Trooper" in 1978).

"Barbados" was later successfully covered by the Vengaboys in 1999 as "We're Going to Ibiza".

Typically Tropical sold 381,456 copies of "Barbados" (as of November 2019) compared to the cover, "We're Going to Ibiza" by the Vengaboys which has sold 1,862,451 (as of November 2019).

== Discography ==
=== Albums ===
- Barbados Sky (1975)

=== Singles ===
Year	A-side	B-side	UK	AUS	BEL (FLA)	BEL (WAL)	DEN	GER	IRE	NL (40)	NL (100)	NZ	NOR	SA	SWE	US
1975	"Barbados"	"Sandy"	1	20	17	32	4	8	1	10	11	5	6	1	11	108
1975	"Rocket Now"	"Hole in the Sky"	—	—	—	—	—	—	—	—	—	—	—	—	—	—
1976	"Everybody Plays the Fool"	"Sylvan's a Barbadian"	—	—	—	—	—	—	—	—	—	—	—	—	—	—
1977	"Jubilee"	"Pretty Baby"	—	—	—	—	—	—	—	—	—	—	—	—	—	—
1979	"My Rubber Ball"	"The Joker"	—	—	—	—	—	—	—	—	—	—	—	—	—	—
1981	"Lady "D""	"Cool Cool Music"	—	—	—	—	—	—	—	—	—	—	—	—	—	—

=== Re-issues ===
Year	A-side	B-side
1978	"Barbados"	"In the Stew"
1981	"Barbados"	"Rocket Now"
1982	"Barbados"	"Rocket Now"

=== Singles released under different aliases ===
Year	Alias	A-side	B-side
1975	Captain Zero	"Space Walk"	"I'm Only an Elf"
1975	Calvert & West	"The Ghost Song"	"Eternity Isle"
1976	Rollercoaster	"Bridlington"	"Eternity Isle"
1979	Black Rod	"Rockin' in the House of Commons"	"Going to the Country"

== See also ==
- List of one-hit wonders on the UK Singles Chart
- List of artists who reached number one on the UK Singles Chart
