= We're Going to Ibiza =

1999 single by Vengaboys

"We're Going to Ibiza!"

Single by Vengaboys

from the album The Party Album
- Released: March 1999
- Genre: Euro reggae
- Length: 3:08
- Label: Breakin'; Positiva
- Songwriters: Jeff Calvert; Max West
- Producers: Danski; DJ Delmundo

Vengaboys singles chronology
"Boom, Boom, Boom, Boom!!" (1998)	"We're Going to Ibiza!" (1999)	"Kiss (When the Sun Don't Shine)" (1999)

Music video
- "We're Going to Ibiza!" on YouTube

"We're Going to Ibiza!" is a song by Dutch Eurodance group Vengaboys. It was released in March 1999 as the second and final single from their second studio album, The Party Album (1999). Based on Typically Tropical's 1975 number-one hit "Barbados", the song reached number one on the UK Singles Chart in September 1999, becoming the group's second number-one single there. Outside the UK, the song also reached number one in the band's native Netherlands and became a top-five hit in Flanders, Norway, and Sweden.

The song is notable for the pronunciation of its title as /ɪˈbiːtsə/ ih-BEE-tsə by the vocalist Kim Sasabone, which is unusual in English but a common pronunciation in the Netherlands, where the group is based.

== Critical reception ==
Jim Wirth from NME commented, "Who better than the peerless Vengaboys to soundtrack this moment of pure spiritual tranquillity with a spot of ersatz reggae?" The Daily Record stated that the 1975 number-one hit, "We're Going to Barbados, "has been reworked and renamed. Cheesier than a quattro formaggio pizza." Pop Rescue wrote that the song "isn't half as clubby as their previous singles", adding that "Kim's vocals are pretty good here apart from where she has to reach a high note, which is a bit wobbly on the way up to. Robin and Roy hold back for some 'woah!' vocals only."

== Popularity in Austria ==
After the revelation of the Ibiza affair in May 2019, which caused the resignation of Austrian Vice-Chancellor Heinz-Christian Strache, demonstrators in Vienna used the song as a protest song. As a consequence, the song re-entered the Austrian singles chart and eventually reached number 16. This popularity culminated with a live performance by the Vengaboys at the Donnerstagsdemonstrationen (German: 'Thursday demonstrations') protests in front of the Chancellery in Vienna.

== Music video ==
The animated music video for the song features the Vengaboys travelling to Ibiza via a circuitous route that takes them all across the world. In the Washington D.C. part, a man and a woman silhouetted in a window of the Capitol building are having sex, a reference to the Clinton–Lewinsky scandal.

== Track listings ==
- Dutch CD1
1. "We're Going to Ibiza!" (Hitradio mix)
2. "We're Going to Ibiza!" (DJ Peran remix)
3. "We Like to Party!" (Jason Nevins club mix)
4. "We Like to Party!" (Tin Tin Out remix)
5. "We Like to Party!" (Klubbheads remix)
6. "We Like to Party!" (Jason Nevins dub mix)
- Dutch CD2
1. "We're Going to Ibiza!" (Hitradio mix)
2. "We Like to Party!" (Jason Nevins club mix)
- UK CD1
1. "We're Going to Ibiza!" (Hitradio mix) – 3:36
2. "We're Going to Ibiza!" (Hitclub extended remix) – 5:07
3. "Vengaboys Megamix" – 5:47
4. "We're Going to Ibiza!" (video)
- UK CD2
1. "We're Going to Ibiza!" (Hitradio mix) – 3:36
2. "We're Going to Ibiza!" (DJ Peran remix) – 6:40
3. "Paradise" (DJ Jam X & De Leon's DuMonde mix)
- UK cassette single
1. "We're Going to Ibiza!" (Hitradio mix) – 3:36
2. "We're Going to Ibiza!" (Hitclub extended remix) – 5:07
3. "Vengaboys Megamix" – 5:47
- Australian CD single
1. "We're Going to Ibiza!" (Hitradio mix) – 3:40
2. "We're Going to Ibiza!" (Hitclub Airplay) – 3:25
3. "We're Going to Ibiza!" (DJ Peran remix) – 6:44
4. "We're Going to Ibiza!" (Hitclub extended remix) – 5:08
5. "Paradise" (DJ Jam X & De Leon's DuMonde mix) – 8:38
6. "We're Going to Ibiza!" (video)

== Charts ==
=== Weekly charts ===
1999 weekly chart performance for "We're Going to Ibiza"
Chart (1999)	Peak position
Australia (ARIA)	26
Austria (Ö3 Austria Top 40)	12
Belgium (Ultratop 50 Flanders)	2
Belgium (Ultratop 50 Wallonia)	33
Canada Dance/Urban (RPM)	10
Czech Republic (IFPI)	27
Denmark (Tracklisten)	6
Europe (Eurochart Hot 100)	5
Finland (Suomen virallinen lista)	9
France (SNEP)	25
Germany (GfK)	9
Ireland (IRMA)	9
Italy (Musica e dischi)	15
Netherlands (Dutch Top 40)	1
Netherlands (Single Top 100)	1
New Zealand (Recorded Music NZ)	6
Norway (VG-lista)	3
Scottish Singles Sales (Official Charts)	1
Spain (Promusicae)	9
Sweden (Sverigetopplistan)	2
Switzerland (Schweizer Hitparade)	7
UK Singles (Official Charts)	1

2019 weekly chart performance for "We're Going to Ibiza"
Chart (2019)	Peak position
Austria (Ö3 Austria Top 40)	16

=== Year-end charts ===
Year-end chart performance for "We're Going to Ibiza"
Chart (1999)	Position
Belgium (Ultratop 50 Flanders)	7
Europe (Eurochart Hot 100)	32
Europe Border Breakers (Music & Media)	24
France (SNEP)	99
Germany (Media Control)	54
Netherlands (Dutch Top 40)	2
Netherlands (Single Top 100)	2
New Zealand (RIANZ)	31
Romania (Romanian Top 100)	43
Sweden (Hitlistan)	13
UK Singles (OCC)	38
UK Pop (Music Week)	7

=== Decade-end charts ===
Chart (1990–1999)	Rank
Netherlands (Dutch Top 40)	11

== Certifications ==
Certifications and sales for "We're Going to Ibiza"
Region	Certification	Certified units/sales
Australia (ARIA)	Gold	35,000^{^}
Belgium (BRMA)	Platinum	50,000^{*}
Denmark (IFPI Danmark)	Gold	45,000^{‡}
Netherlands (NVPI)	Platinum	75,000^{^}
New Zealand (RMNZ)	Gold	15,000^{‡}
Sweden (GLF)	Platinum	30,000^{^}
United Kingdom (BPI)	Platinum	583,000
^{*} Sales figures based on certification alone.^{^} Shipments figures based on certification alone.^{‡} Sales+streaming figures based on certification alone.

== Release history ==
Release dates and formats for "We're Going to Ibiza"
Region	Date	Format(s)	Label	Ref.
Netherlands	March 1999	CD	Breakin'	
Spain	18 May 1999	12-inch vinyl	Blanco y Negro	
United Kingdom	6 September 1999	CD; cassette	Positiva	
