= To Brazil! =

1997 single by Vengaboys

Single by Vengaboys

from the album Up & Down – The Party Album
- Released: 1997
- Genre: Eurodance
- Length: 3:06
- Label: Jive
- Songwriter(s): Jorge Lima Menezes; Ary Barroso; Danski & DJ Delmundo
- Producer(s): Danski & DJ Delmundo

Vengaboys singles chronology
"Parada de Tettas" (1997)	"To Brazil!" (1997)	"Up and Down" (1998)

"To Brazil!" is a song by Dutch Eurodance group Vengaboys from their debut studio album Up & Down – The Party Album. It was released as the album's second single in 1997 by Jive Records. The song incorporates elements from "Aquarela do Brasil", composed by Ary Barroso.

== Track listing ==
- Dutch CD single
1. "To Brazil!" (Radio) – 3:06
2. "To Brazil!" (Medium Radio) – 3:20
3. "To Brazil!" (XXL) – 4:31
4. "Parada de Tettas" (Remix Radio) – 3:59
5. "Parada de Tettas" (Remix XXL) – 4:44

== Charts ==
Chart (1998)	Peak position
Netherlands (Single Top 100)	23

== 2014 remix ==
"2 Brazil!"

Single by Vengaboys
- Released: May 15, 2014
- Genre: Dance-pop
- Length: 3:44
- Label: Breakin'
- Songwriter(s): Jorge Lima Menezes; Ary Barroso; Danski & DJ Delmundo
- Producer(s): Jaywalker; Delmundo

Vengaboys singles chronology
"Hot Hot Hot" (2013)	"2 Brazil!" (2014)	"Where Did My Xmas Tree Go" (2014)

On May 14, 2014 Vengaboys released a 2014 version of the song in connection with the 2014 FIFA World Cup in Brazil.

=== Track listing ===
- Dutch digital download
1. "2 Brazil!" (Dance Radio) – 2:55
2. "2 Brazil!" (Hit Radio) – 3:21
3. "2 Brazil!" (Extended Dance Radio) – 4:21
4. "2 Brazil!" (Extended Hit Radio) – 3:48
5. "2 Brazil!" (Hit Radio Instrumental) – 3:21
6. "2 Brazil!" (Hitradio Instrumental with Brazil Chant) – 3:21
7. "2 Brazil!" (Like Brazil Remix) – 4:45
8. "2 Brazil!" (Like Brazil Remix - Edit) – 2:52
- Belgian digital download
1. "2 Brazil!" (Hit Radio Edit) – 3:21
2. "2 Brazil!" (Dance Radio Edit) – 2:55
3. "2 Brazil!" (Extended Dance Mix) – 4:21
4. "2 Brazil!" (Extended Hit Radio) – 3:48
5. "2 Brazil!" (Hitradio Instrumental with Brazil Chant) – 3:21
- German CD single
1. "2 Brazil!" (Dance Radio) – 2:55
2. "2 Brazil!" (Hit Radio) – 3:21
3. "2 Brazil!" (Extended Dance Radio) – 4:21
4. "2 Brazil!" (Extended Hit Radio) – 3:48
5. "2 Brazil!" (Like Brazil Remix) – 4:45
6. "2 Brazil!" (Like Brazil Remix - Edit) – 2:52

=== Charts ===
Chart (2014)	Peak position
Belgium (Ultratip Bubbling Under Flanders)	42
Netherlands (Single Top 100)	48
