= Boom, Boom, Boom, Boom!! =

1998 single by Vengaboys

Single by Vengaboys

from the album Greatest Hits! Part 1 and The Party Album
- Released: 16 October 1998
- Genre: Eurodance; pop
- Length: 3:22
- Label: Breakin'; Positiva
- Songwriters: Dennis van Den Driesschen; Benny Andersson; Wessel van Diepen; Björn Ulvaeus
- Producer: Vengaboys

Vengaboys singles chronology
"We Like to Party!" (1998)	"Boom, Boom, Boom, Boom!!" (1998)	"We're Going to Ibiza" (1999)

Music video
- "Boom, Boom, Boom, Boom!!" on YouTube

"Boom, Boom, Boom, Boom!!" is a song by Dutch Eurodance group Vengaboys, released as a single in October 1998 from the band's first compilation, Greatest Hits! Part 1 (1998), and their first international studio album, The Party Album (1999). It reached number one on the UK Singles Chart in June 1999 and peaked atop the charts of Flanders, the Netherlands, New Zealand, Norway, and Sweden while also topping the Canadian RPM Dance 30 chart. It was a top-10 hit in several other countries, including Australia, France, and Italy.

== Background ==
The song was written by Vengaboys producers Danski and Delmundo, with the first verse interpolating the ABBA song "Lay All Your Love on Me" written by Benny Andersson and Björn Ulvaeus. It was released to radio in the United States in June 1999 and re-released to US radio in June 2017. In the United Kingdom, Positiva Records issued the song as two CD single.

== Composition ==
"Boom, Boom, Boom, Boom!!" is a Eurodance and pop song that runs for 3 minutes and 22 seconds. It is written in the key of F-sharp major and maintains a tempo of 138 beats per minute in common time.

== Critical reception ==
The song received mixed reviews, though most were generally positive. It was named the fifth "worst ever summer song" in a survey conducted by Tony Blackburn and music e-tailer www.bol.com. AllMusic editor William Cooper wrote that "the campy approach can be overbearing, but the upbeat, tuneful material on this release is difficult to dislike." Andrew Cowen from the Birmingham Post described the song as being "as daft as the title". While Craig Seymour of The Buffalo News named it a "boppy uptempo tune" that is "sure to please the aerobics instructor in all of us". BuzzFeed listed the song at number 66 in their list of "The 101 Greatest Dance Songs Of the '90s" in 2017. Can't Stop the Pop described it as "a relentless tour-de-force of Eurodance". They added that "it's like a slightly poppier take on 2 Unlimited, with perfectly crisp, dizzying Wurlitzer-synth melodies and a thumping beat that evokes the spirit – if not quite the reality – of mid-‘90s club nights." A writer from the Daily Record said that Vengaboys were ready "for their biggest hit yet", adding that it, like their previous singles, was "another full on party anthem". The writer also wrote that the song "has more bounce than a bouncy castle", and added, "Start singing it and you won't stop all day. Band of the year anyone?"

Insider said that "this sweet and poppy hit is a total earworm and chances are you still remember it all these years later." A reporter from the Milton Keynes Citizen branded it a "spine-chilling teeny-pop chart hit". The song was featured at number fifteen on The People's list of "top songs of 1999". Pop Rescue wrote that "this song is so catchy – with its thumping beats, simple melody, and easy to remember chorus. It includes plenty of big ‘woaahhohohohoh‘ dance vocals and robotic vocal samples." Katjusa Cisar from the Wisconsin State Journal described it as "a sublime mix of catchy melodies, booming bass and stupidly simple lyrics, dating back to the days when Euro dance-pop was at its peak."

== Chart performance ==
The song debuted at number one on the UK Singles Chart for the week ending 20 June 1999. It has sold over 620,000 copies in the UK as of July 2014.

== Live performances ==
On 28 July 2000, Vengaboys performed the song twice at the Stadium Merdeka in Malaysia.

== Track listings ==
- Dutch CD single
1. "Boom, Boom, Boom, Boom!!" (airplay) – 3:23
2. "Boom, Boom, Boom, Boom!!" (Brooklyn Bounce Boombastic remix) – 6:55
- Dutch maxi-CD single
1. "Boom, Boom, Boom, Boom!!" (airplay) – 3:23
2. "Boom, Boom, Boom, Boom!!" (Brooklyn Bounce Boombastic remix) – 6:55
3. "Boom, Boom, Boom, Boom!!" (Mark van Dale with Enrico remix) – 6:32
4. "Boom, Boom, Boom, Boom!!" (XXL version) – 5:22
5. "Boom, Boom, Boom, Boom!!" (Equator remix) – 6:18
6. "Boom, Boom, Boom, Boom!!" (Pronti & Kalmani remix) – 6:48
7. "Boom, Boom, Boom, Boom!!" (Beat Me Up Scotty remix) – 7:37
- UK CD1
1. "Boom, Boom, Boom, Boom!!" (airplay mix) – 3:23
2. "Boom, Boom, Boom, Boom!!" (Brooklyn Bounce Boombastic remix) – 6:55
3. "Boom, Boom, Boom, Boom!!" (Klubbheads vs Cab 'N' Crew remix) – 6:31
4. "Boom, Boom, Boom, Boom!!" (video)
- UK CD2
1. "Boom, Boom, Boom, Boom!!" (XXL version) – 5:22
2. "Boom, Boom, Boom, Boom!!" (Sharp Boys Master Blaster remix) – 7:00
3. "'Superfly Slick'" (Olav Basoski mix) – 6:30
- UK cassette single
1. "Boom, Boom, Boom, Boom!!" (airplay mix) – 3:23
2. "Boom, Boom, Boom, Boom!!" (Brooklyn Bounce Boombastic remix) – 6:55
3. "'Superfly Slick'" (Olav Basoski mix) – 6:30
- Australian CD single
1. "Boom, Boom, Boom, Boom!!" (airplay) – 3:24
2. "Boom, Boom, Boom, Boom!!" (XXL version) – 5:24
3. "Boom, Boom, Boom, Boom!!" (Brooklyn Bounce Boombastic remix) – 6:57
4. "Boom, Boom, Boom, Boom!!" (Klubbheads vs Cab 'N' Crew remix) – 6:32
5. "Boom, Boom, Boom, Boom!!" (Beat Me Up Scotty remix) – 7:40
- US maxi-CD single
1. "Boom, Boom, Boom, Boom!!" (airplay) – 3:23
2. "Boom, Boom, Boom, Boom!!" (Brooklyn Bounce Boombastic remix) – 6:55
3. "Boom, Boom, Boom, Boom!!" (Sharp Boys Master Blaster remix) – 7:00
4. "Boom, Boom, Boom, Boom!!" (Mark van Dale with Enrico remix) – 6:32
5. "Boom, Boom, Boom, Boom!!" (XXL version) – 5:22
6. "Boom, Boom, Boom, Boom!!" (Equator remix) – 6:18
7. "Boom, Boom, Boom, Boom!!" (Pronti & Kalmani remix) – 6:48
- US 2×12-inch single

A1. "Boom, Boom, Boom, Boom!!" (XXL version) – 5:22
A2. "Boom, Boom, Boom, Boom!!" (Equator remix) – 6:18
B1. "Boom, Boom, Boom, Boom!!" (Brooklyn Bounce) – 6:55
C1. "Boom, Boom, Boom, Boom!!" (Sharp Boys Master Blaster mix) – 7:00
C2. "Boom, Boom, Boom, Boom!!" (Pronti & Kalmani remix) – 6:48
D1. "Boom, Boom, Boom, Boom!!" (Mark van Dale with Enrico) – 6:32
D2. "Boom, Boom, Boom, Boom!!" (airplay mix) – 3:23

== Charts ==
=== Weekly charts ===
Weekly chart performance for "Boom, Boom, Boom, Boom!"
Chart (1998–1999)	Peak position
Australia (ARIA)	2
Austria (Ö3 Austria Top 40)	8
Belgium (Ultratop 50 Flanders)	1
Belgium (Ultratop 50 Wallonia)	25
Canada Dance/Urban (RPM)	1
Denmark (IFPI)	4
Europe (Eurochart Hot 100)	3
Finland (Suomen virallinen lista)	19
France (SNEP)	4
Germany (GfK)	6
Hungary (Mahasz)	4
Iceland (Íslenski Listinn Topp 40)	8
Ireland (IRMA)	7
Italy (Musica e dischi)	2
Netherlands (Dutch Top 40)	1
Netherlands (Single Top 100)	1
New Zealand (Recorded Music NZ)	1
Norway (VG-lista)	1
Scottish Singles Sales (Official Charts)	1
Spain (Promusicae)	11
Sweden (Sverigetopplistan)	1
Switzerland (Schweizer Hitparade)	13
UK Singles (Official Charts)	1
US Billboard Hot 100	84
US Dance Club Play (Billboard)	13
US Maxi-Singles Sales (Billboard)	2
US Rhythmic Top 40 (Billboard)	37

=== Year-end charts ===
1998 year-end chart performance for "Boom, Boom, Boom, Boom!"
Chart (1998)	Position
Belgium (Ultratop 50 Flanders)	7
Netherlands (Dutch Top 40)	31
Netherlands (Single Top 100)	6

1999 year-end chart performance for "Boom, Boom, Boom, Boom!"
Chart (1999)	Position
Australia (ARIA)	24
Austria (Ö3 Austria Top 40)	35
Belgium (Ultratop 50 Wallonia)	78
Canada Dance/Urban (RPM)	12
Europe (Eurochart Hot 100)	13
Europe Border Breakers (Music & Media)	39
France (SNEP)	16
Germany (Media Control)	33
Italy (Musica e dischi)	16
Netherlands (Dutch Top 40)	35
Netherlands (Single Top 100)	17
New Zealand (RIANZ)	16
Romania (Romanian Top 100)	63
Sweden (Hitlistan)	4
UK Singles (OCC)	15
UK Pop (Music Week)	10
US Maxi-Singles Sales (Billboard)	16

2000 year-end chart performance for "Boom, Boom, Boom, Boom!"
Chart (2000)	Position
US Maxi-Singles Sales (Billboard)	41

=== Decade-end charts ===
Chart (1990–1999)	Rank
Netherlands (Dutch Top 40)	12

== Certifications ==
Certifications and sales for "Boom, Boom, Boom, Boom!!"
Region	Certification	Certified units/sales
Australia (ARIA)	Platinum	70,000^{^}
Belgium (BRMA)	Platinum	50,000^{*}
Denmark (IFPI Danmark)	Platinum	90,000^{‡}
France (SNEP)	Gold	250,000^{*}
Germany (BVMI)	Gold	250,000^{^}
Italy (FIMI)	Gold	50,000^{‡}
Netherlands (NVPI)	2× Platinum	150,000^{^}
New Zealand (RMNZ)	2× Platinum	60,000^{‡}
Spain (Promusicae)	Gold	30,000^{‡}
Sweden (GLF)	2× Platinum	60,000^{^}
United Kingdom (BPI)	2× Platinum	1,200,000^{‡}
^{*} Sales figures based on certification alone.^{^} Shipments figures based on certification alone.^{‡} Sales+streaming figures based on certification alone.

== Release history ==
Release dates and formats for "Boom, Boom, Boom, Boom!!"
Region	Date	Format(s)	Label(s)	Ref.
Europe	16 October 1998	CD	Breakin'; Jive	
Spain	13 January 1999	12-inch vinyl	Blanco y Negro	
United Kingdom	14 June 1999	CD; cassette	Positiva	

== Usage in the media ==
In November 1999, "Boom, Boom, Boom, Boom!!" was used in an advert in Japan for Nissan for their Wingroad 5-door estate. In 2001, British furniture retailer DFS used the song to front a promotion campaign and their sales increased by ten per cent. In 2007, Lisa Vaas from eWeek reported that an internet viral game containing malware had been used to gain remote control of computers; once in control, the attackers would "torture" their victims by playing Boom, Boom, Boom, Boom. In 2012, US recording artist Rye Rye sampled the song in the chorus to her single "Boom Boom". It was also used during the credits of the last editions of the Jeux sans frontières in 1999. Beginning in 2022, the song was adapted into a chant by supporters of English football club Crystal Palace, with the lyrics "Boom, Boom, Boom, Boom / Mateta's in the room / There ain't no striker better / Than Jean-Philippe Mateta".
