= Vengaboys =

Dutch Eurodance music group

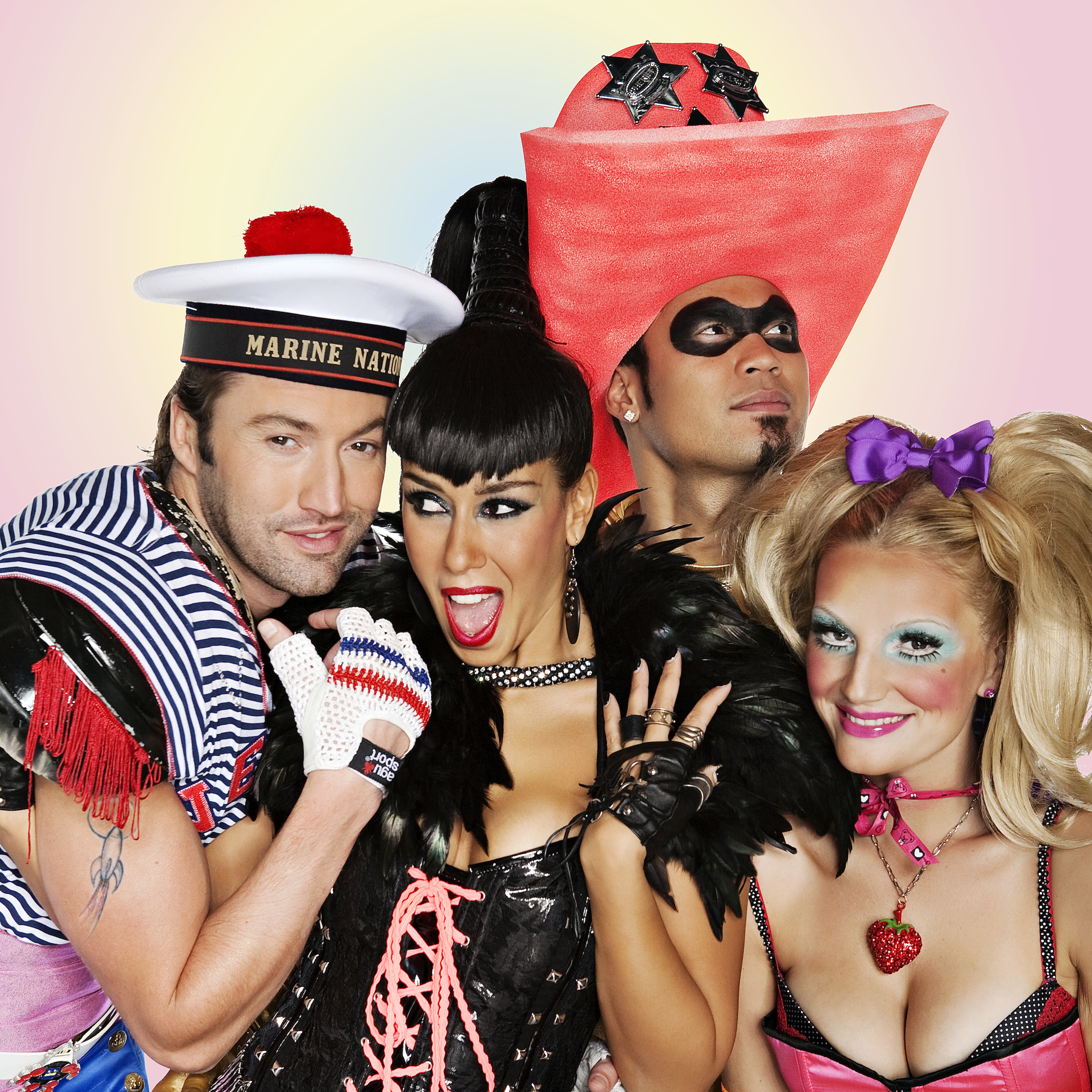
- Vengaboys in 2009. From left to right: Robin Pors, Kim Sasabone, Donny Latupeirissa and Denise Post-Van Rijswijk

Background information
- Origin: Rotterdam, Netherlands
- Genres: Eurodance; dance-pop
- Years active: 1997–2004; 2007–present
- Labels: Breakin' Records; Violent Music BV
- Members: Kim Sasabone; Denise van Rijswijk; Robin Pors; Donny Latupeirissa
- Past members: Roy den Burger; Yorick Bakker; Mark Jong-a-Pin; Lynn Allien
- Website: vengaboys.com

Vengaboys (/ˈbɛŋɡəbɔɪz/ BENG-gə-boyz) is a Dutch Eurodance music group based in Rotterdam consisting of lead and female vocalist Kim Sasabone, female vocalist Denise van Rijswijk and male vocalists Robin Pors and Donny Latupeirissa. Created by Dutch producers Wessel van Diepen (who selected the group members) and Dennis van den Driesschen (known as Danski and Delmundo), the group enjoyed commercial success in the late 1990s. They are best known for their hit singles "We Like to Party", "Boom, Boom, Boom, Boom!!", and "We're Going to Ibiza", the latter two of which topped the UK Singles Chart and have sold an estimated 25 million records worldwide.

Vengaboys won two World Music Awards in a row for World's Best-Selling Benelux Group in 2000 and 2001. In 2019, Dutch online newspaper Nu.nl called Vengaboys the most successful Dutch pop group in history.

== History ==
=== 1996–1998: Formation, Up and Down, and The Party Album ===
The name "Vengaboys" was originally the title of the electronic musical project of Dutch producers Danski and Delmundo as DJs in the early 90s. It derives from the Spanish word venga, meaning "come on!" In 1997 they decided to use the name to produce a pop group, choosing the Moluccan-Dutch singer Kim Sasabone as the vocal lead. After some auditions, Denise Post-Van Rijswijk, Roy den Burger and Robin Pors were added to complete the group.

In August 1997, the group released their debut single "Parada de Tettas", followed by "To Brazil!" in December 1997 and "Up and Down" in February 1998. In April 1998, the group released their debut album Up & Down – The Party Album in the Netherlands and Belgium. The album was certified gold in the Netherlands. This was followed by "We Like to Party" in May, which peaked at number 2 on the Dutch charts and at number 1 in Belgium in June 1998.

In October the group released "Boom, Boom, Boom, Boom!!" and Greatest Hits! Part 1; the album peaked at number 1 on the Dutch chart.

In November 1998, Vengaboys entered the UK Singles Chart at number 4 with "Up and Down". "We Like to Party" was released internationally in 1999 and was a Top 10 hit in many European countries, Canada, Australia, and New Zealand. It reached number 26 on the Billboard Hot 100.

In June 1999, Vengaboys released Greatest Hits! Part 1 as The Party Album; their debut studio album. The single "Boom Boom Boom Boom" topped the charts in the UK, New Zealand and the Netherlands. In November 1999 "Boom, Boom, Boom, Boom!!" was also used in an advert in Japan for Nissan for their Wingroad 5-door estate.

"We're Going to Ibiza", a reworking of Typically Tropical's 1975 number 1 hit "Barbados", also reached the top slot in the Netherlands in September 1999. The LP spent 30 consecutive weeks on the U.S. Billboard 200, and was certified gold (500,000 units) in November 1999.

The Remix Album was released in January 2000, featuring new dance remixes of the songs from Vengaboys' debut record.

=== 2000–2002: Departure of Pors, The Platinum Album and hiatus ===
Shortly before the release of their next studio album, Pors left the group to pursue a solo career and was replaced by dolphin trainer Yorick Bakker.

The Platinum Album was released in early 2000, which saw continued success for the group, as its first three singles "Kiss (When the Sun Don't Shine)", "Shalala Lala" and "Uncle John from Jamaica" all charted in Europe, Australia and New Zealand, and Canada, with the first two going on to top the New Zealand charts. For the album's fourth single, "Cheekah Bow Bow (That Computer Song)", the group gained a virtual member, the animated Cheekah.

In 2002, Post-Van Rijswijk and Bakker left the group which ceased its activities.

=== 2006–2009: Return on stage and line-up changes ===
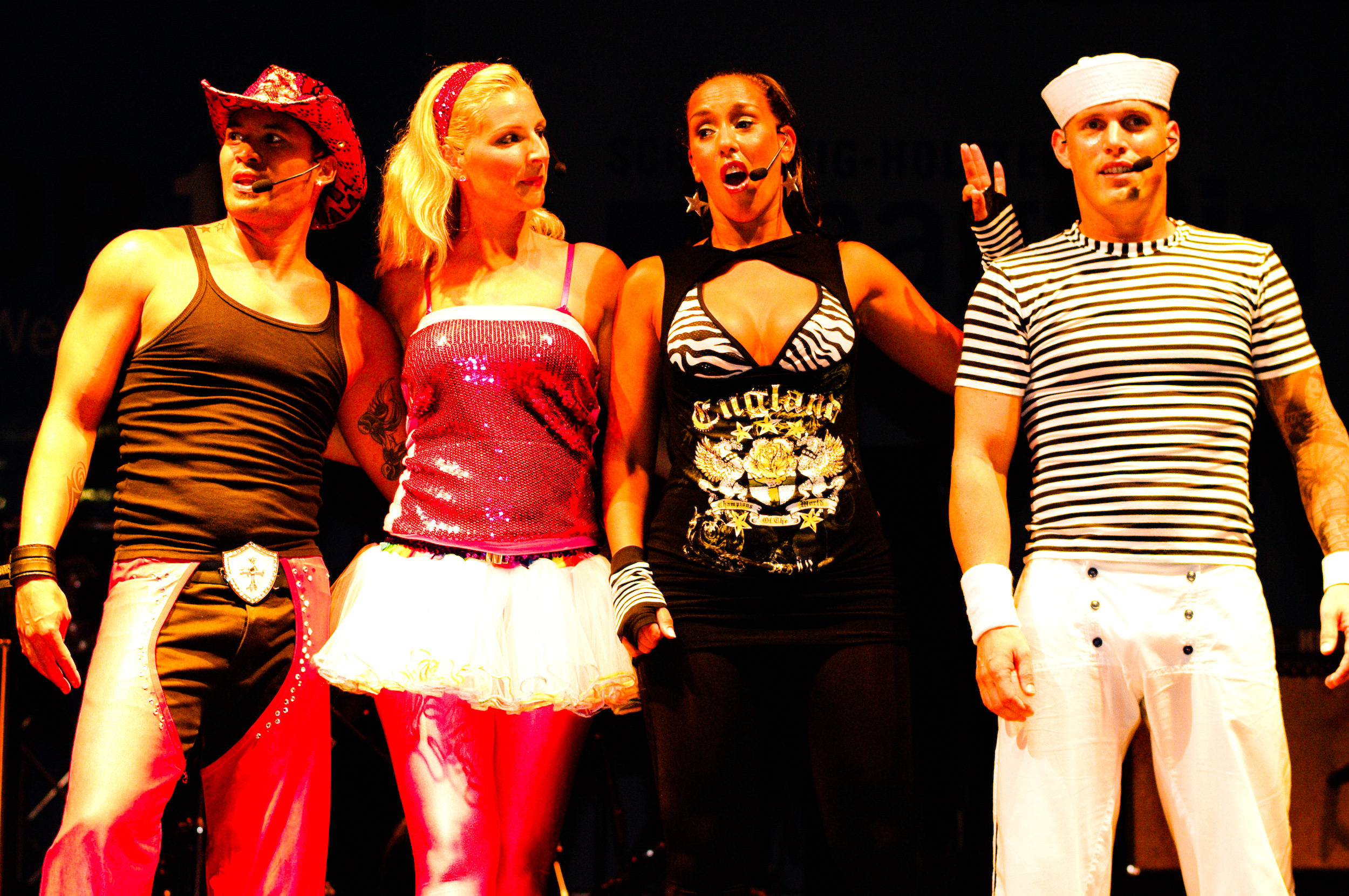
Vengaboys in 2009. Left to right: Donny, Denise, Kim and Yorick

In 2006, the group returned to the club scene with new member Donny Latupeirissa a.k.a. Ma'Donny, replacing Roy den Burger as Cowboy. Post-Van Rijswijk and Bakker rejoined the group at that point. In 2009, Pors also rejoined the group while Bakker left again.

=== 2010–2013: The Best of Vengaboys ===
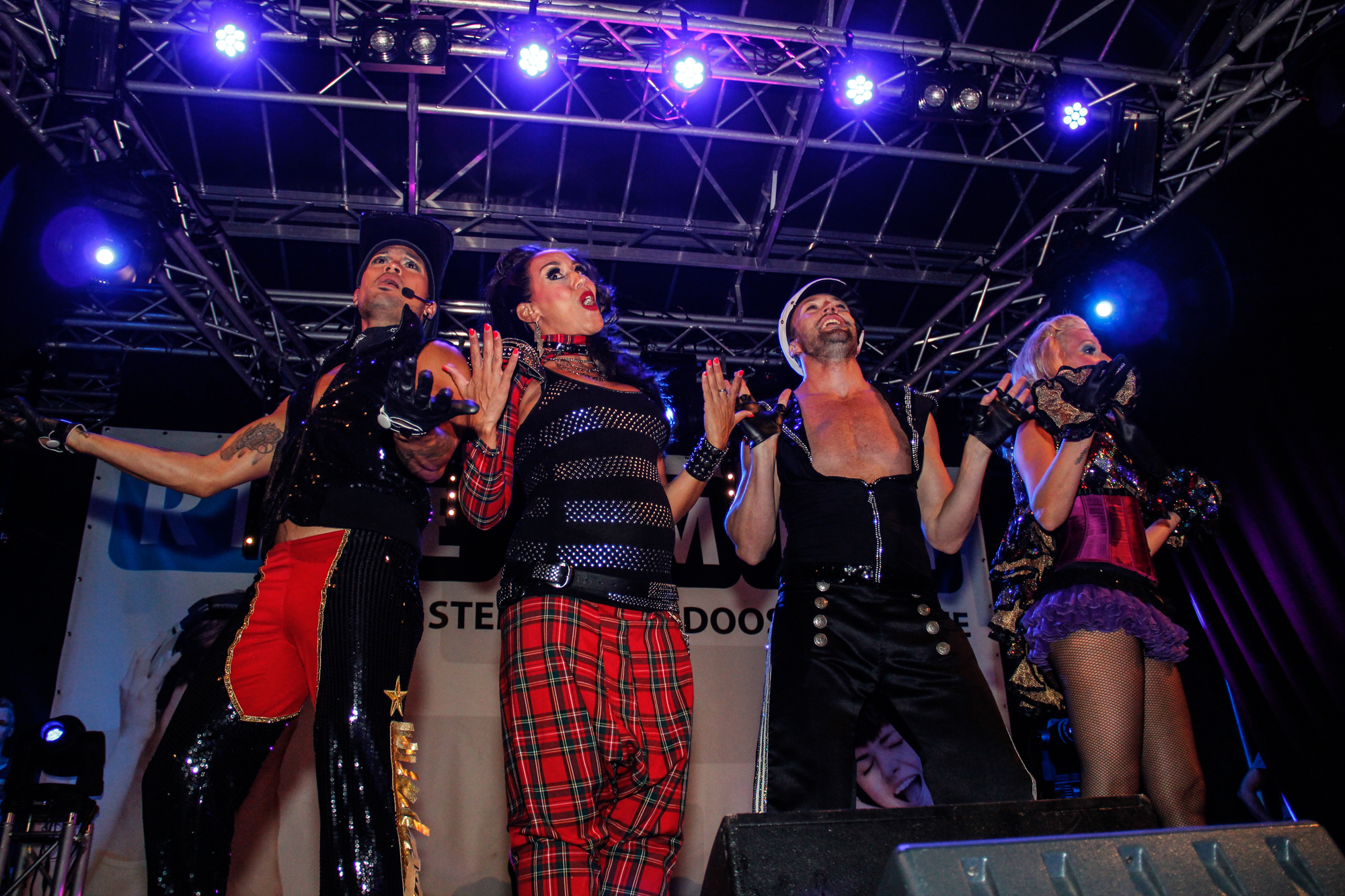
Vengaboys (2013)

In 2010, the band released a new single, "Rocket To Uranus", a collaboration with singer-songwriter Pete Burns and American celebrity Perez Hilton. The video premiered on 6 June at the Dutch television station TMF, and in 2D and 3D formats on their own website and YouTube channel.

In December 2011, the group released The Best of Vengaboys in Australia. They performed at Trinity May Ball in June 2012.

In January 2013, the group first performed a cover of "Hot, Hot, Hot", during their National Tour in Australia. The song was released in July 2013 as a single.

Around that time, Kim Sasabone became pregnant.

=== 2014–2015: X-mas Party Album ===
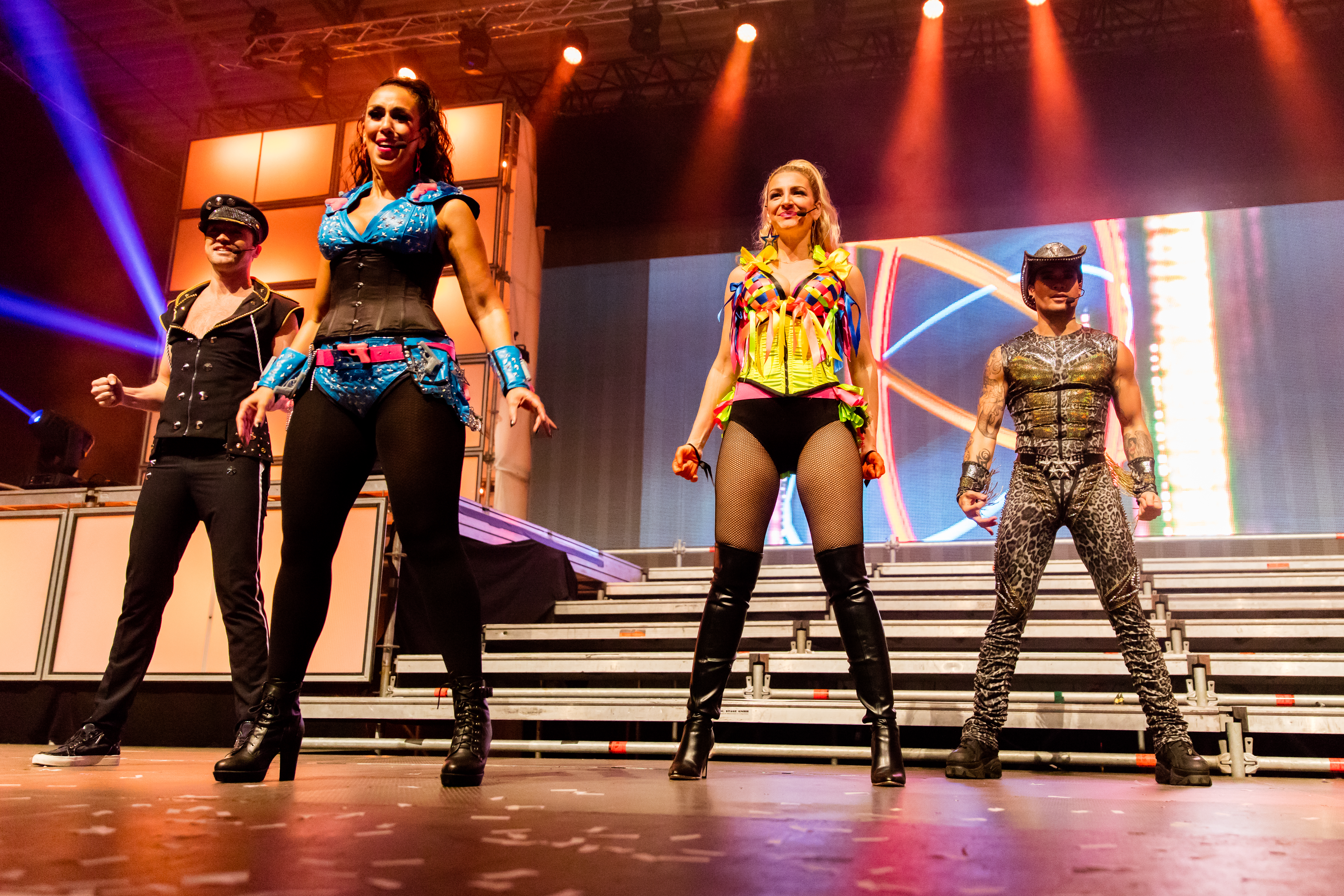
Vengaboys on stage in 2015

In January 2014, Robin Pors said in an interview in Dubai that the group intended to continue touring in Europe and that they were working on future shows in the Middle East and India, along with performing their greatest hits, their latest single, "Hot, Hot, Hot", and reportedly new unreleased tracks. He also stated that releasing new material was planned for 2014. In May 2014 a new remix from their single "To Brazil" re-titled "2 Brazil" was released.

In November 2014 a new album was released called The X-mas Party Album including all Vengaboys' hits with a Christmas sound. Also, the single "Where Did My X-mas Tree Go" was released together with a new music video. A tour of South Africa was scheduled for December.

=== 2015–2017: Australia and New Zealand tour ===
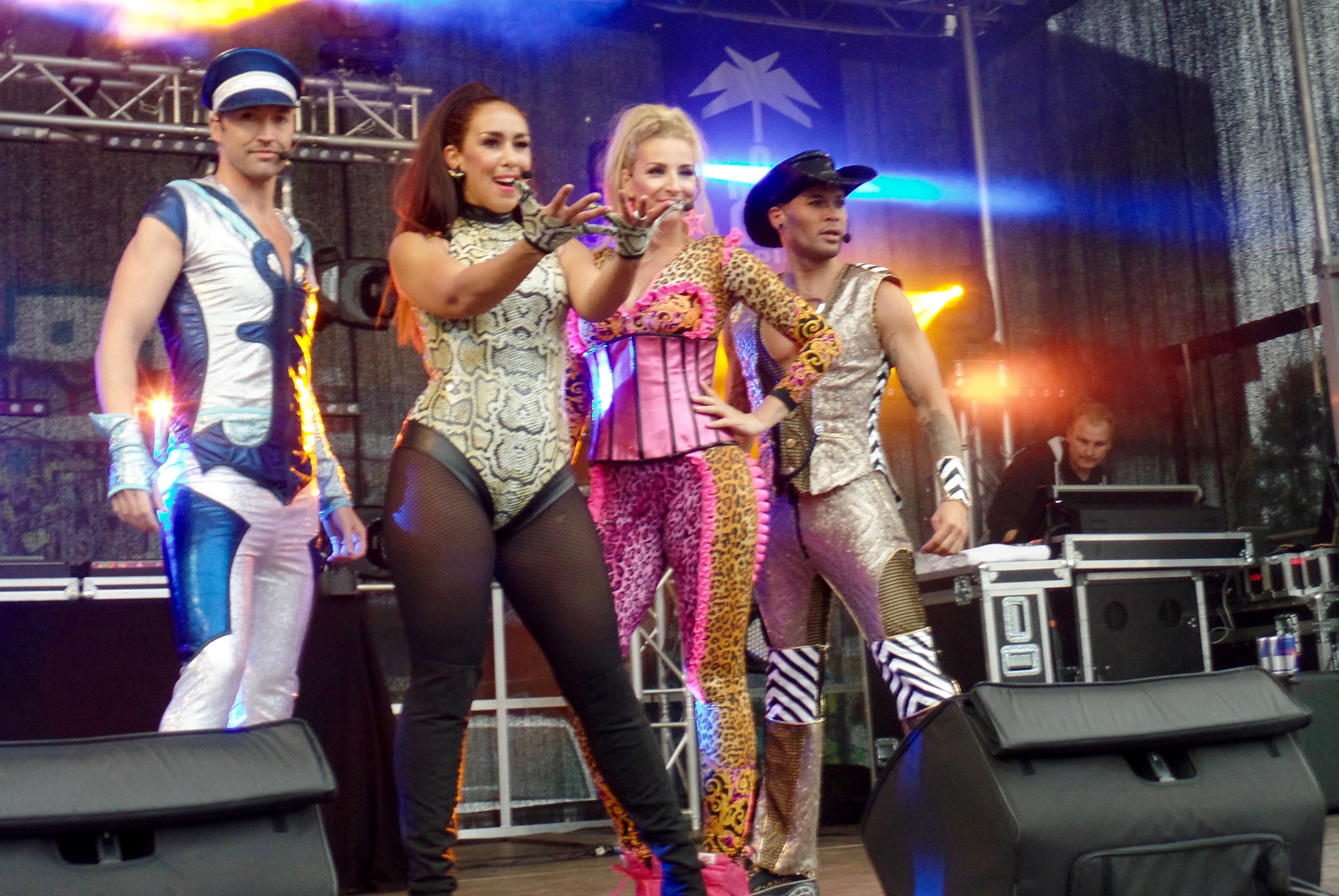
Vengaboys (2016)

In late February 2015, Denise Post-Van Rijswijk said that she was pregnant with her second child.

In 2016, the group toured Australia and New Zealand.

In November and December 2017, Vengaboys supported Steps at their Party on the Dancefloor Tour.

=== 2019: 20th anniversary and Unplugged EP ===
In 2019, Vengaboys celebrated their 20th anniversary and released unplugged versions of the songs "Boom, Boom, Boom, Boom" and "We're Going to Ibiza!" and released an EP titled Unplugged #1's.

=== 2020–2025: Covers and re-mixes ===
In the summer of 2020, the band released a festival version of their worldwide hit "Up & Down" with Australian DJ and producer Timmy Trumpet, with the new version credited to Timmy Trumpet x Vengaboys.

In September 2021, the band released a cover version of Charli XCX and Troye Sivan's "1999", retitled "1999 (I Wanna Go Back)" and came with a deep fake-style video which saw the cover stars from various 1990s albums lip-syncing to the song and the band put into the Friends title sequence with the sofa and fountain.

In September 2021, Vengaboys took part in 90's Nostalgia: Electric Circus tour in Canada, featuring Eurodance music.

In December 2024, Kim Sasabone announced she was taking a break to rest and would be replaced for the rest of their tour by Cilla Niekoop from Ch!pz.

On 23 July 2025, Vengaboys opened for Scissor Sisters and Kesha at New York's Madison Square Garden for The Tits Out Tour.

== Members ==
Current

- Kim Sasabone (1997–2004, 2007–2024, 2026–present)
- Denise Post-Van Rijswijk (1998–2002, 2007–present)
- Robin Pors (1998–1999, 2009–present)
- Donny Latupeirissa (2007–2011, 2013–2018; 2021–present)

Former

- Roy den Burger (1998–2004)
- Yorick Bakker (1999–2002, 2007–2009)
- Mark Jong-a-Pin (2002–2004, 2018–2020)
- Lynn Allien (2002–2004)

=== Touring ===
- JJ van Zon (2012)
- Cilla Niekoop (2024–2026)

== Discography ==
=== Regional release ===
- Up & Down – The Party Album (1998)

=== Worldwide releases ===
- The Party Album (1999)
- The Platinum Album (2000)

== Tours ==
- Busssing To The Beach Tour (2013)

Date (2013)	City	Country	Venue
January 10	St. Kilda	Australia	The Esplanade Hotel
January 11	Bateau Bay	Australia	The Entrance Leagues Club
January 12	Coogee Bay	Australia	Selina's
January 17	Hornsby	Australia	Hornsby RSL
January 18	Brisbane	Australia	The Hi-Fi
January 19	Fremantle	Australia	Metropolis

- Acceleration Tour (2014)

Date (2014)	City	Country	Venue
January 17	Dubai	United Arab Emirates	Unknown
March 21	Hatfield	England	The Forum Hertfordshire
July 19	Bielsko-Biała	Poland	Lotnisko Aleksandrowice
July 20	Newcastle upon Tyne	England	Exhibition Park
August 2	Kaatsheuvel	The Netherlands	Efteling
August 29	Mogyoród	Hungary	Hungagoring
October 17	Assen	The Netherlands	TT Circuit
December 12	Johannesburg	South Africa	Carnival City Casino
December 13	Johannesburg	South Africa	Carnival City Casino
December 14	Cape Town	South Africa	Grand Arena at GrandWest Casino
December 15	Port Elizabeth	South Africa	Boardwalk

- The Vengabus is Coming Tour (2018)

Date (2018)	City	Country	Venue
January 23	Liverpool	England	Camp & Furnace
January 23	Preston	England	Guild Hall
January 24	Sheffield	England	O2 Academy
January 25	Liverpool	England	Camp & Furnance
January 26	Manchester	England	Albert Hall
January 27	Newcastle	England	Boiler Shop
September 12	Liverpool	England	Camp & Furnace
September 12	Manchester	England	Albert Hall
September 13	Newcastle	England	Boiler Shop
September 14	Liverpool	England	Camp & Furnace
September 14	Newcastle	England	Boiler Shop

- 25th Anniversary Tour (2022)

Date (2022)	City	Country	Venue
February 4	Auckland	New Zealand	Auckland Town Hall
February 8	Cairns	Australia	Gilligans
February 9	Brisbane	Australia	Fortitude Music Hall
February 11 ^{(Cancelled}^{)}	Sunshine Coast	Australia	NightQuarter
February 11 ^{(Replacement)}	Melbourne	Australia	Forum
February 12	Melbourne	Australia	Forum
February 16	Sydney	Australia	Big Top
February 17 ^{(Added)}	Wollongong	Australia	Waves
February 18	Adelaide	Australia	Hindley St. Music Hall
February 19	Perth	Australia	Metro City

- ‘90’s Mania Tour (2025)

Date (2025)	City	Country	Venue
January 17	Perth	Australia	Metro City
January 18	Sydney	Australia	Enmore Theater
January 19	Wollongong	Australia	Waves
January 22	Canberra	Australia	Southern Cross Club
January 23	Hobart	Australia	Wrest Point Entertainment Centre
January 24	Melbourne	Australia	Festival Hall
January 25	Brisbane	Australia	Eatons Hill Hotel
January 28	Christchurch	New Zealand	Christchurch Town Hall
January 29	Auckland	New Zealand	Auckland Town Hall

- #NonStopWorldTour (2025–2026)

Date (2025)	City	Country	Venue
April 4	Mexico City	Mexico	Pepsi Center (I Love Dance)
April 6	Monterrey	Mexico	Parque Fundidora (Tecate Pa’l Norte 2025)
July 12	Göteborg	Sweden	Skatås (Vielsker 2025)
July 13	Sheffield	England	Don Valley Bowl (Summerbowl Fest)
July 15	Nijmegen	The Netherlands	Overdekt Podium (Vierdaagsefeesten 2025)
July 19	Kaltenkirchen	Germany	Open Air Kaltenkirchen (Kaki Summer Party)
July 20	Someren	The Netherlands	Sportpark de Heikampen (Zum Schluss Outdoor)
July 23	New York City	United States	Madison Square Garden (Kesha: ‘The Tits Out’ Tour)
July 25	Erding	Germany	Therme Erding (‘90’s Party)
July 26	Malmö	Sweden	Pildammsparken (Vielsker 2025)
July 27	Poole	England	Baiter Park (Poole Harbour Festival)
August 15	Sant Jordi de ses Salines	Spain	Hard Rock Hotel Ibiza (COT80s Ibiza)
August 16	Vejle	Denmark	Cirkuspladsen (Vielsker 2025)
August 22	Stafford	England	Penkridge Sports & Recreation Centre ( 90’s Night)
August 23	Odense	Denmark	Kongens Have (Vielsker 2025)
August 29	Zandvoort	The Netherlands	Circuit Park Zandvoort
August 30	Aalborg	Denmark	Agri Nord Aalborg (Vielsker 2025)
August 31	Jedburgh	Scotland	Lilliardsedge Holiday Park (Edgefest)
September 5	Aachen	Germany	100,5 Arena (Oktoberfest)
September 6	St. Helens	England	Sherdley Park (Reminisce Festival)
September 13	Stockholm	Sweden	Ms. Viking Cinderella (90’s Party)
September 19	Cluj-Napoca	Romania	BT Arena (Discoteca 90)
September 20	Kraków	Poland	Tauron Arena Kraków (Turn Back the Time)
September 25	Hamburg	Germany	Aida Cruise 2025
September 27	Vught	The Netherlands	IJM Strandhuys (IJM Live)
October 11	Barcelona	Spain	Parc del Fòrum (Love The 90's)
November 14	Playa del Ingles Gran Canaria	Spain	Winter Pride Maspalomas 2025
November 28	Manchester	England	Manchester Cathedral (Echoes)
November 29	Skegness	England	Butlins Resort Skegness (9p's Reloaded)
December 6	London	England	The Clapham Grand

Date (2026)	City	Country	Venue
January 24	Bognor Regis	England	Butlins Bognor Regis
February 21	Berlin	Germany	Uber Arena Berlin (90's Super Show)
March 14	Dortmund	Germany	Westfallenhallen (90's Super Show)
March 20	Mexico City	Mexico	Arena CDMX (Love The 90's)

== See also ==
- List of number-one dance hits (United States)
- List of artists who reached number one on the US Dance chart
