= Parada de Tettas =

Single by Vengaboys

from the album Up & Down – The Party Album
- Released: August 1997
- Genre: Eurodance
- Label: Jive
- Songwriters: Danski; DJ Delmundo
- Producers: Danski; DJ Delmundo

Vengaboys singles chronology
"Parada de Tettas" (1997)	"To Brazil!" (1997)

"Parada de Tettas" is a song by the Dutch Eurodance group Vengaboys, released in August 1997 as their debut single by Jive Records. The title is a misspelled Spanish phrase intended to mean parade of tits.

The song entered the Dutch Singles Chart on 23 August 1997 at number 67, peaked at number 29, and remained on the chart for ten weeks.

== Music video ==
The music video was recorded at the Baja Beach Club, Netherlands.

== Track listing ==
Dutch CD single
No.	Title	Length
1.	"Parada De Tettas (Radio)"	4:00
2.	"Tettas Galore! (XL)"	5:45

Dutch maxi-single
No.	Title	Length
1.	"Parada De Tettas (Radio)"	4:00
2.	"Parada De Tettas (Video)"	3:55
3.	"Parada De Tettas (Radio XL)"	5:31
4.	"Parada De Tettas (XXL)"	6:16
5.	"Tettas Galore! (Radio)"	3:26
6.	"Tettas Galore! (XL)"	5:45
7.	"Acatettapella"	1:19

== Charts ==
Chart (1997)	Peak position
Netherlands (Single Top 100)	29
