= We Like to Party =

1998 single by Vengaboys

"We Like to Party! (The Vengabus)"

Single by Vengaboys

from the album Up & Down – The Party Album and The Party Album
- Released: 15 May 1998
- Genre: Eurodance
- Length: 3:41
- Label: Breakin'; Positiva
- Songwriters: Danski; DJ Delmundo
- Producers: Danski; DJ Delmundo

Vengaboys singles chronology
"Up and Down" (1998)	"We Like to Party! (The Vengabus)" (1998)	"Boom, Boom, Boom, Boom!!" (1998)

Music video
- "We Like to Party! (The Vengabus)" on YouTube

"We Like to Party!" (subtitled "The Vengabus" for its release as a single) is a song by Dutch Eurodance group Vengaboys. Co-written and co-produced by DJ Delmundo with Danski, it was released in the Netherlands in May 1998 as the fourth single from the band's debut album, Up & Down – The Party Album (1998). Following its success in Benelux, it was given a worldwide release on 9 November 1998.

"We Like to Party!" became one of the band's most successful hits, topping the chart in Flanders, reaching number two in Australia and the Netherlands, and becoming a top-five hit in Germany, Ireland, Switzerland and the United Kingdom. It is also the band's highest-charting song in the United States, climbing to number 26 on the Billboard Hot 100, and in Canada, where it peaked at number 10. The accompanying music video was directed by Wendelien van Diepen and filmed in Spain.

== Composition ==
"We Like to Party!" is a Eurodance song that runs for 3 minutes and 41 seconds. It is written in the key of A♭ major and maintains a tempo of 136 beats per minute in common time.

== Critical reception ==
The song received positive reviews from music critics. AllMusic editor William Cooper described it as a "bouncy eurodisco hit", and noted further that it was "reminiscent of Aqua's 'Barbie Girl', with its singalong chorus, cutesy female vocal squeal, and wacky synth beats." Larry Flick from Billboard magazine wrote, "This wildly energetic foursome (two gals, two guys) from the Netherlands is pretty much a household name throughout Europe, where this infectious pop gem has been a constant on radio and in clubs. Already, 'We Like To Party!' has gone platinum and double-platinum in Belgium and the act's homeland, respectively. Here, the song could meet a similar fate, especially since it features a sugar-soaked sing-along chorus that hangs out in your head until you beg for relief. That said, people who embraced Aqua's 'Barbie Girl', Cleopatra's 'Romeo and Juliet', and Los del Rio's 'Macarena' will be lining up for this latest slice of energetic pop. Are you listening, radio? (It's already hit No. 1 on the playlist of dance leader WKTU New York.) Conversely, this will be a no-brainer for club jocks, who continue to make major noise with the group's sweat-soaked debut, 'Up and Down'."

An editor from Daily Record called it "cheesy disco from Europe's top selling boy-girl band who are already lining up a massive summer single." Jim Farber from Entertainment Weekly commented, "Attention, lovers of cheeseball club music. The Vengaboys' hit 'We Like to Party!' combines a campy disco beat, party-girl vocals, and a killer hook in the form of a ship horn in full blare. What began as a beach anthem in Ibiza, Spain, is becoming a Stateside smash on the increasingly Euro-driven U.S. charts. And why not? It's too willfully silly to resist." In a retrospective review, Pop Rescue remarked its "unmistakeable Vengaboys sound", describing it as "a fast-paced energetic track".

== Commercial performance ==
The single proved to be a higher seller than "Up and Down" in the United Kingdom, where it peaked at number three in March 1999, eventually selling 474,000 copies, making it the 29th-biggest hit of the year. The song additionally reached number one in Flemish Belgium, number two in Australia and the Netherlands, number three in Ireland, number four in Germany and Switzerland, number six in Austria and Italy, number nine in New Zealand and number 10 in Canada and Walloon Belgium. It additionally reached the top 20 in France. The song became the group's biggest hit in the United States, peaking at number 26 on the US Billboard Hot 100 and selling 405,000 copies.

== Music video ==
The music video for "We Like to Party" was directed by Wendelien van Diepen. It first aired in March 1999. The video features all four Vengaboys members and other tourists travelling to various destinations in the Province of Barcelona such as Piera and Gavà, in a 1930s style mini-bus, the "Vengabus" (a 1933 Chevrolet series O Bus), where they end up in a nightclub in La Barceloneta, Barcelona.

A new "silent" version of the video was released in January 2022 via the band's official YouTube channel. It features isolated vocals and dubbed ambient sound effects based on the visuals.

== Track listings ==
- Dutch CD single
1. "We Like to Party!" (airplay) – 3:42
2. "We Like to Party!" (BCM XXL) – 6:21
- Dutch maxi-CD single
1. "We Like to Party!" (airplay) – 3:44
2. "We Like to Party!" (BCM remix) – 4:04
3. "We Like to Party!" (more airplay) – 5:49
4. "We Like to Party!" (original) – 4:06
5. "We Like to Party!" (BCM XXL) – 6:21
6. "We Like to Party!" (Baunz mix) – 4:45
7. "We Like to Party!" (Full Schwingg) – 4:36
8. "We Like to Party!" (D.J. Vanhaze Hitmix) – 7:01
- French CD single
1. "We Like to Party!" (airplay mix) – 3:42
2. "We Like to Party!" (more airplay mix) – 5:49
- UK CD1
1. "We Like to Party! (The Vengabus)" (more airplay mix) – 5:49
2. "We Like to Party! (The Vengabus)" (Klubbheads remix) – 6:05
3. "We Like to Party!" (Tin Tin Out remix) – 6:30
- UK CD2 and cassette single
1. "We Like to Party! (The Vengabus)" (airplay mix) – 3:42
2. "We Like to Party! (The Vengabus)" (Jason Nevins remix) – 6:38
3. "Up and Down" (BCM radio) – 3:28
- Australian and New Zealand CD single
1. "We Like to Party! (The Vengabus)" (airplay edit) – 3:44
2. "We Like to Party! (The Vengabus)" (Klubbheads mix) – 6:07
3. "We Like to Party! (The Vengabus)" (more airplay) – 5:50
4. "Up and Down" (video mix) – 3:40
5. "Up and Down" (Tin Tin Out mix) – 8:14
- US maxi-CD single
1. "We Like to Party! (The Vengabus)" (airplay) – 3:42
2. "We Like to Party! (The Vengabus)" (Klubbheads mix) – 6:05
3. "We Like to Party! (The Vengabus)" (BCM remix) – 4:03
4. "We Like to Party! (The Vengabus)" (more airplay) – 5:49
5. "We Like to Party! (The Vengabus)" (Full Schwingg) – 4:36
6. "We Like to Party! (The Vengabus)" (DJ Disco mix) – 4:31
7. "We Like to Party! (The Vengabus)" (Baunz mix) – 4:45
8. "We Like to Party! (The Vengabus)" (BCM XXL) – 6:21
- US 2×12-inch single

A1. "We Like to Party! (The Vengabus)" (extended club mix) – 5:49
A2. "We Like to Party! (The Vengabus)" (DJ Disco mix) – 4:31
B1. "We Like to Party! (The Vengabus)" (Jason Nevins club mix) – 7:07
C1. "We Like to Party! (The Vengabus)" (Klubbheads mix) – 6:05
C2. "We Like to Party! (The Vengabus)" (Baunz mix) – 4:45
D1. "We Like to Party! (The Vengabus)" (BCM mix) – 6:21
D2. "We Like to Party! (The Vengabus)" (Jason Nevins dub mix) – 5:50

== Charts ==
=== Weekly charts ===
Weekly chart performance for "We Like to Party"
Chart (1998–1999)	Peak position
Australia (ARIA)	2
Austria (Ö3 Austria Top 40)	6
Belgium (Ultratop 50 Flanders)	1
Belgium (Ultratop 50 Wallonia)	10
Canada Top Singles (RPM)	10
Canada Dance/Urban (RPM)	1
Canada (Nielsen SoundScan)	7
Denmark (IFPI)	11
Europe (Eurochart Hot 100)	10
Finland (Suomen virallinen lista)	14
France (SNEP)	18
Germany (GfK)	4
Hungary (Mahasz)	3
Ireland (IRMA)	3
Italy (Musica e dischi)	6
Netherlands (Dutch Top 40)	2
Netherlands (Single Top 100)	2
New Zealand (Recorded Music NZ)	9
Scottish Singles Sales (Official Charts)	2
Sweden (Sverigetopplistan)	56
Switzerland (Schweizer Hitparade)	4
UK Singles (Official Charts)	3
US Billboard Hot 100	26
US Dance Club Play (Billboard)	5
US Mainstream Top 40 (Billboard)	23
US Maxi-Singles Sales (Billboard)	3
US Rhythmic Top 40 (Billboard)	19

=== Year-end charts ===
1998 year-end chart performance for "We Like to Party"
Chart (1998)	Position
Belgium (Ultratop 50 Flanders)	8
Belgium (Ultratop 50 Wallonia)	98
Europe (Eurochart Hot 100)	65
Europe Border Breakers (Music & Media)	49
Germany (Media Control)	58
Netherlands (Dutch Top 40)	5
Netherlands (Single Top 100)	11

1999 year-end chart performance for "We Like to Party"
Chart (1999)	Position
Australia (ARIA)	17
Belgium (Ultratop 50 Wallonia)	83
Canada Top Singles (RPM)	69
Canada Dance/Urban (RPM)	3
Europe (Eurochart Hot 100)	53
Romania (Romanian Top 100)	69
UK Singles (OCC)	29
UK Pop (Music Week)	3
US Mainstream Top 40 (Billboard)	98
US Maxi-Singles Sales (Billboard)	4
US Rhythmic Top 40 (Billboard)	64

=== Decade-end charts ===
Chart (1990–1999)	Rank
Netherlands (Dutch Top 40)	26

== Certifications and sales ==
Sales and certifications for "We Like to Party"
Region	Certification	Certified units/sales
Australia (ARIA)	Platinum	70,000^{^}
Belgium (BRMA)	Platinum	50,000^{*}
Netherlands (NVPI)	Platinum	75,000^{^}
New Zealand (RMNZ)	Platinum	30,000^{‡}
United Kingdom (BPI)	Platinum	652,000
United States	—	405,000
^{*} Sales figures based on certification alone.^{^} Shipments figures based on certification alone.^{‡} Sales+streaming figures based on certification alone.

== Release history ==
Release dates and formats for "We Like to Party"
Region	Date	Format(s)	Label(s)	Ref.
Netherlands	15 May 1998	CD	Breakin'	
Europe	9 November 1998	12-inch vinyl; CD	Various	
United Kingdom	1 March 1999	CD; cassette	Positiva	

== In popular culture ==
- The song's popularity was revived when used in 2004 as the main theme for Six Flags' "Mr. Six" advertising campaign.
