= Up and Down (Vengaboys song) =

1998 single by Vengaboys

Single by Vengaboys

from the album Up & Down – The Party Album and The Party Album
- Released: 27 February 1998
- Genre: Eurodance
- Length: 4:02
- Label: Jive; Positiva
- Songwriters: Wessel van Diepen; Dennis van den Driesschen
- Producer: Vengaboys

Vengaboys singles chronology
"To Brazil!" (1997)	"Up and Down" (1998)	"We Like to Party!" (1998)

Music video
- "Up and Down" on YouTube

"Up and Down" is a song by Dutch Eurodance group Vengaboys. Originally released in the Netherlands in February 1998, it reached number four in the United Kingdom in November 1998. It also reached number one on the US Dance Club Play chart in 1999. The Tin Tin Out remix of the song was sampled in DMC's remix of Cher's "Believe". The "Wooo!" voice in the song is sampled from "Crash Goes Love" by Loleatta Holloway. The accompanying music video was directed by Wendelien van Diepen and produced by Zapruder films. The scenario is by Hilde Pat.

== Critical reception ==
Larry Flick from Billboard magazine described the song as a "sweat-soaked" debut. Pop Rescue wrote in their review, "It's simple – 'up and down, up and down, up…. and down' – not much to remember when you're dancing to it in a club at 3am. Again the thumping beat and bouncy little synth riffs are there, and aside from that simple almost-aerobic exercise set of lyrics, there's not much more to it. This probably played to its benefit, helping to keep it un-cluttered and catchy."

== Track listings ==
- Dutch CD single
1. "Up and Down" (airplay)
2. "Up and Down" (hard and long)
- Dutch and Australasian maxi-CD single
1. "Up and Down" (airplay)
2. "Up and Down" (hard radio)
3. "Up and Down" (BCM radio)
4. "Up and Down" (more airplay)
5. "Up and Down" (hard and long)
6. "Up and Down" (BCM clubmix)
7. "Up and Down" (airplay XXL)
- UK CD and cassette single
1. "Up and Down" (airplay mix) – 3:41
2. "Up and Down" (Tin Tin Out remix) – 7:48
3. "Up and Down" (Johan S. Toxic dub mix) – 6:49
- UK 12-inch single

A1. "Up and Down" (airplay XXL) – 5:51
A2. "Up and Down" (Johan's Toxic club mix) – 6:49
AA1. "Up and Down" (Tin Tin Out remix) – 7:48

== Charts ==
=== Weekly charts ===
Weekly chart performance for "Up and Down"
Chart (1998–1999)	Peak position
Australia (ARIA)	55
Austria (Ö3 Austria Top 40)	24
Belgium (Ultratop 50 Flanders)	11
Canada Top Singles (RPM)	24
Canada Dance/Urban (RPM)	4
Europe (Eurochart Hot 100)	9
France (SNEP)	72
Germany (GfK)	12
Iceland (Íslenski Listinn Topp 40)	35
Ireland (IRMA)	3
Italy (Musica e dischi)	15
Netherlands (Dutch Top 40)	5
Netherlands (Single Top 100)	5
New Zealand (Recorded Music NZ)	27
Scottish Singles Sales (Official Charts)	2
Switzerland (Schweizer Hitparade)	32
UK Singles (Official Charts)	4
UK Dance (Official Charts)	1
UK Indie (Official Charts)	36
US Dance Club Play (Billboard)	1
US Maxi-Singles Sales (Billboard)	15

=== Year-end charts ===
1998 year-end chart performance for "Up and Down"
Chart (1998)	Position
Belgium (Ultratop 50 Flanders)	62
Europe (Eurochart Hot 100)	94
Europe Border Breakers (Music & Media)	38
Germany (Media Control)	47
Netherlands (Dutch Top 40)	30
Netherlands (Single Top 100)	49
UK Singles (OCC)	41

1999 year-end chart performance for "Up and Down"
Chart (1999)	Position
Canada Dance/Urban (RPM)	26
US Dance Club Play (Billboard)	29
US Maxi-Singles Sales (Billboard)	36

== Certifications ==
Certifications and sales for "Up and Down"
Region	Certification	Certified units/sales
United Kingdom (BPI)	Platinum	785,000

== Release history ==
Release dates and formats for "Up and Down"
Region	Date	Format(s)	Label(s)	Ref.
Netherlands	27 February 1998	CD	Jive	
United Kingdom	16 November 1998	12-inch vinyl; CD; cassette	Positiva	

== See also ==
- Number-one dance hits of 1999
