= Sing (disambiguation) =

To sing is to produce musical sounds with a voice.

Sing may also refer to:

== Film ==
- Sing (1989 film), an American musical drama film following a fictional SING! production in New York City
- Sing! (2001 film), a 2001 American documentary short film about the Los Angeles Children's Chorus
- Sing (franchise), an American CGI-animated musical film franchise
  - Sing (2016 American film), the first film in the series
  - Sing 2, a 2021 sequel to the 2016 film
- Sing (2016 Hungarian film), a short film and 2017 Oscar winner

== Music ==
=== Artists ===
- Super Impassioned Net Generation, a Chinese girl group

=== Albums ===
- Sing (Gary Barlow & The Commonwealth Band album) or the title song (see below), 2012
- Sing (Jim Bianco album) or the title song, 2008
- Sing! (album), by Esther & Abi Ofarim, 1966
- Sing (If You Want It), by Omar, or the title song, 2006
- Sings (Conway Twitty album), 1958
- Sings (Emi Tawata album), 2009
- Sjung (English: Sing), by Laleh, or the title song, 2012
- Sing, by Maria Doyle Kennedy, or the title song, 2012
- Sing, by Neil Zaza, 1996
- Sing, by Super Impassioned Net Generation, 2017
- Sings, by Angélique Kidjo' 2015

=== Songs ===
- "Sing" (Annie Lennox song), 2007
- "Sing" (The Dresden Dolls song), 2006
- "Sing" (Ed Sheeran song), 2014
- "Sing" (Gary Barlow song), 2012
- "Sing" (My Chemical Romance song), 2010
- "Sing" (Sesame Street song), 1971; covered by Barbra Streisand (1972) and the Carpenters (1973)
- "Sing" (Theo Tams song), 2008
- "Sing" (Travis song), 2001
- "Sing" (Wynonna Judd song), 2009
- "Sing!" (song), from the musical A Chorus Line, 1975
- "Sing", by Blur from Leisure, 1991
- "Sing", by Dope from Group Therapy, 2003
- "Sing", by Hollywood Undead from Day of the Dead, 2015
- "Sing", by Jars of Clay from Who We Are Instead, 2003
- "Sing", by Nakatomi, 1996
- "Sing", by Sarah Nixey from Sing, Memory, 2007
- "Sing", by Parokya ni Edgar from Pogi Years Old, 2016
- "Sing", by Pentatonix from Pentatonix, 2015
- "Sing", by She & Him from Volume Two, 2010
- "Sing", by Unwritten Law from Swan, 2011
- "Sing", from Blue's Big Musical Movie, 2000

== People ==
- Matt Sing (born 1975), Australian rugby player
- Sing Chew, Chinese singer

== Other uses ==
- Sing! (competition), an annual student performance in some New York City high schools
- Sing (video game), or Sing Party, a 2012 Wii U game
- Sistema Interconectado del Norte Grande, a power grid in the Norte Grande zone of Chile
- Spitzer Infrared Nearby Galaxies Survey, a survey of 75 galaxies using the Spitzer Space Telescope

== See also ==
- Singh, surname
  - List of people with surname Singh
- Synge (surname)
- Sing Sing (disambiguation)
- Sing Sing Sing (disambiguation)
