= Synge =

Synge is an Irish surname. Notable people with the name include:

- Cathleen Synge Morawetz (1923–2017), Canadian mathematician
- Edward Synge (archbishop of Tuam) (1659–1741), Anglican clergyman who served in the Church of Ireland
- Edward Synge (bishop of Elphin) (1691–1762), Anglican bishop in the Church of Ireland
- Edward Hutchinson Synge (1890–1957), inventor of the near-field optical microscope
- John Lighton Synge (1897–1995), Irish mathematician and physicist
- John Millington Synge (1871–1909), Irish playwright, poet, and prose writer
- Mary Helena Synge (1840-1917) Irish composer
- Nicholas Synge (died 1771), 18th-century Irish Anglican priest
- Patrick Synge (1910–1982), British botanist, writer and plant hunter
- Richard Laurence Millington Synge (1914–1994), British biochemist
- Violet Synge Girl Guide Chief Commissioner for England
- William Synge (1826-1891), British diplomat and writer

== See also ==
- Synge (hill), a categorisation of British hills named after Tim Synge
