= The Platinum Album (Vengaboys album) =

Studio album by Vengaboys
- Released: 13 March 2000
- Recorded: 1999–2000
- Genre: Dance-pop; Eurodance
- Length: 39:03
- Label: Breakin'; Violent Music BV; EMI Electrola; Jive; Groovilicious; Avex Trax
- Producer: Danski & DJ Delmundo

Vengaboys chronology
The Remix Album (1999)	The Platinum Album (2000)	Greatest Hits (2009)

Singles from The Platinum Album
- 1. "Kiss (When the Sun Don't Shine)" Released: 26 November 1999; 2. "Shalala Lala" Released: 21 February 2000; 3. "Uncle John from Jamaica" Released: May 2000; 4. "Cheekah Bow Bow (That Computer Song)" Released: 18 September 2000; 5. "Forever as One" Released: 21 February 2001

Professional ratings
Review scores
Source	Rating
AllMusic	3/5 stars

The Platinum Album is the second studio album by Dutch dance group Vengaboys. The album spawned five singles.

In March 2020, the album was re-released to celebrate its 20th anniversary, with the addition of "Take Me to the City", previously only released on the US edition of the album.

== Track listing ==
=== Standard version ===
No.	Title	Writer(s)	Producer(s)	Length
1.	"Shalala Lala"	Torben Lendager, Poul Dehnhardt	Danski & DJ Delmundo	3:36
2.	"24/7 in My 911"	Danski & DJ Delmundo	Danski & DJ Delmundo	3:12
3.	"Kiss (When the Sun Don't Shine)"	Danski & DJ Delmundo	Danski & DJ Delmundo	3:31
4.	"Uncle John from Jamaica"	Danski & DJ Delmundo	Danski & DJ Delmundo	3:08
5.	"Cheekah Bow Bow (That Computer Song) [Album Version]"	Danski & DJ Delmundo	Danski & DJ Delmundo	3:03
6.	"48 Hours"	Danski & DJ Delmundo	Danski & DJ Delmundo	4:21
7.	"Your Place or Mine?"	Danski & DJ Delmundo, Dietmar Kawohl	Danski & DJ Delmundo	4:08
8.	"Skinnydippin'"	Danski & DJ Delmundo	Danski & DJ Delmundo	3:30
9.	"Forever as One (Album Version)"	Danski & DJ Delmundo	Danski & DJ Delmundo	3:31
10.	"Opus 3 in D#"	Danski & DJ Delmundo	Danski & DJ Delmundo	7:12

=== US edition and 2020 digital re-release ===
No.	Title	Writer(s)	Producer(s)	Length
1.	"Shalala Lala"	Lendager & Dehnhardt	Danski & DJ Delmundo	3:35
2.	"24/7 In My 911"	Danski & DJ Delmundo	Danski & DJ Delmundo	3:12
3.	"Kiss (When the Sun Don't Shine)"	Danski & DJ Delmundo	Danski & DJ Delmundo	3:31
4.	"Uncle John from Jamaica"	Danski & DJ Delmundo	Danski & DJ Delmundo	3:08
5.	"Cheekah Bow Bow (That Computer Song) [Hit Radio Mix]"	Danski & DJ Delmundo	Danski & DJ Delmundo	2:53
6.	"48 Hours"	Danski & DJ Delmundo	Danski & DJ Delmundo	4:20
7.	"Your Place or Mine?"	Danski, DJ Delmundo & D.Kawohl	Danski & DJ Delmundo	4:07
8.	"Skinnydippin'"	Danski & DJ Delmundo	Danski & DJ Delmundo	3:27
9.	"Take Me to the City"	Danski, DJ Delmundo & P. Smit	Danski, DJ Delmundo & P. Smit	3:50
10.	"Forever as One (Hit Radio Mix)"	Danski & DJ Delmundo	Danski & DJ Delmundo	3:29
11.	"Opus 3 in D#"	Danski & DJ Delmundo	Danski & DJ Delmundo	7:11

=== Japan version ===
No.	Title	Writer(s)	Producer(s)	Length
1.	"Shalala Lala"	Lendager & Dehnhardt	Danski & DJ Delmundo	3:36
2.	"24/7 In My 911"	Danski & DJ Delmundo	Danski & DJ Delmundo	3:12
3.	"Kiss (When the Sun Don't Shine)"	Danski & DJ Delmundo	Danski & DJ Delmundo	3:31
4.	"Uncle John from Jamaica"	Danski & DJ Delmundo	Danski & DJ Delmundo	3:08
5.	"Cheekah Bow Bow (That Computer Song)"	Danski & DJ Delmundo	Danski & DJ Delmundo	3:02
6.	"48 Hours"	Danski & DJ Delmundo	Danski & DJ Delmundo	4:21
7.	"Your Place or Mine?"	Danski, DJ Delmundo & D.Kawohl	Danski & DJ Delmundo	4:08
8.	"Skinnydippin'"	Danski & DJ Delmundo	Danski & DJ Delmundo	3:30
9.	"Forever as One"	Danski & DJ Delmundo	Danski & DJ Delmundo	3:31
10.	"Opus 3 In D#"	Danski & DJ Delmundo	Danski & DJ Delmundo	7:16
11.	"Boom, Boom, Boom, Boom!! (Eurobeat Remix)"	Danski & DJ Delmundo	Danski & DJ Delmundo	3:49
12.	"Shalala Lala (Eurobeat Mix)"	Danski & DJ Delmundo	Danski & DJ Delmundo	4:17
13.	"Kiss (When the Sun Don't Shine) [Airscape RMX]"	Danski & DJ Delmundo	Danski & DJ Delmundo	8:04

== Singles ==
- "Kiss (When the Sun Don't Shine)" was released as the lead single of the album in late 1999, peaking at number one in RIANZ singles chart and in Polish singles chart in February 2000.
- "Shalala Lala" was the second single of the album and peaked at number one on RIANZ chart and in Polish singles chart. It's a cover version of the song by Danish glam rock band Walkers, originally released in their Greatest Hits album in 1973.
- "Uncle John from Jamaica" was the third single of the album with less successful single like previous two but it was a Top Ten single in 4 countries: Netherlands, United Kingdom, New Zealand and Poland.
- "Cheekah Bow Bow (That Computer Song)" was released as the fourth single of the album, including the fifth virtual band member, "Cheekah". It peaked at 19 in UK Singles Chart and 14 in Polish singles chart.
- "Forever as One" was released as the fifth single of the album but it was their worst single performance, peaking at 29 on UK Singles Chart.

== Charts ==
=== Weekly charts ===
Chart (2000)	Peak position
Australian Albums (ARIA)	20
Austrian Albums (Ö3 Austria)	2
Belgian Albums (Ultratop Flanders)	5
Danish Albums (Hitlisten)	3
Dutch Albums (Album Top 100)	2
Estonian Albums (Eesti Top 10)	2
Finnish Albums (Suomen virallinen lista)	15
German Albums (Offizielle Top 100)	4
Hungarian Albums (MAHASZ)	3
Irish Albums (IRMA)	3
New Zealand Albums (RMNZ)	1
Norwegian Albums (VG-lista)	10
Portuguese Albums Chart	1
Scottish Albums (OCC)	7
Swedish Albums (Sverigetopplistan)	17
Swiss Albums (Schweizer Hitparade)	2
UK Albums (OCC)	9

=== Year-end charts ===
Chart (2000)	Position
Australian Albums (ARIA)	42
Austrian Albums (Ö3 Austria)	13
Belgian Albums (Ultratop Flanders)	54
Canadian Albums (Nielsen SoundScan)	73
Dutch Albums (Album Top 100)	35
European Albums (Music & Media)	26
German Albums (Offizielle Top 100)	40
New Zealand Albums (RMNZ)	6
Swiss Albums (Schweizer Hitparade)	28
UK Albums (OCC)	70

== Certifications ==
Region	Certification	Certified units/sales
Australia (ARIA)	Platinum	70,000^{^}
Austria (IFPI Austria)	Gold	25,000^{*}
Canada (Music Canada)	Gold	50,000^{^}
Denmark (IFPI Danmark)	Platinum	50,000^{^}
Germany (BVMI)	Gold	150,000^{^}
Hungary (MAHASZ)	Gold	
India	5× Platinum	500,000
Norway (IFPI Norway)	Gold	25,000^{*}
New Zealand (RMNZ)	5× Platinum	75,000^{^}
Poland (ZPAV)	Gold	50,000^{*}
Spain (Promusicae)	Gold	50,000^{^}
Switzerland (IFPI Switzerland)	Platinum	50,000^{^}
United Kingdom (BPI)	Gold	100,000^{^}
^{*} Sales figures based on certification alone.^{^} Shipments figures based on certification alone.
