= Forever as One =

2001 single by Vengaboys

Single by Vengaboys

from the album The Platinum Album
- Released: 12 February 2001
- Recorded: 2000
- Genre: Pop
- Label: Strictly Rhythm
- Songwriter(s): Wessel van Diepen, Dennis van den Driesschen
- Producer(s): Vengaboys, DJ Delmundo

Vengaboys singles chronology
"Cheekah Bow Bow (That Computer Song)" (2000)	"Forever as One" (2001)	"Rocket To Uranus" (2010)

"Forever as One" is a song by Dutch eurodance group Vengaboys released in 2001. It charted at number 28 in the UK Singles Chart, making it their worst performing single. It was also their last release before temporarily disbanding and returning to the club scene. The music video has a cameo appearance of pop band Westlife and another of Jimmy Pop. The inclusion of Westlife was not approved of by their record label, forcing a second edit of the video to be created which excluded the footage of them.

This song is unusual as it is a ballad as opposed to the usual dance type track of which the Vengaboys are best known for.

== Track listing ==
1. "Forever as One (Hitradio)"
2. "Skinnydippin' (D-Bops Naked Mix)"
3. "Double-A Megamix"
4. "Forever as One (Enhanced Video)"

There is also a version of this EP with the Forever as One (Vocals & Strings Version).

== Charts ==
Chart (2001)	Peak position
Germany (GfK)	79
Netherlands (Single Top 100)	77
Scotland (OCC)	23
UK Singles (OCC)	28
