= Uncle John from Jamaica =

2000 single by Vengaboys

Single by Vengaboys

from the album The Platinum Album
- Released: 29 May 2000
- Studio: Violent (Studio 4045) (Hilversum, Netherlands)
- Length: 3:07
- Label: Breakin'
- Songwriters: Danski & DJ Delmundo
- Producers: Danski & DJ Delmundo

Vengaboys singles chronology
"Shalala Lala" (2000)	"Uncle John from Jamaica" (2000)	"Cheekah Bow Bow (That Computer Song)" (2000)

"Uncle John from Jamaica" is a song by Dutch Eurodance group Vengaboys. It was released in May 2000 as the third single from their third album, The Platinum Album (2000), and became a top-10 hit in Austria, the Netherlands, New Zealand and the United Kingdom. It has been certified gold in New Zealand for sales exceeding 5,000 copies.

The original title of the song was "Uncle Tom from Jamaica", but it was changed when the group found out there was a negative meaning to the term "uncle Tom".

== Track listings ==
Dutch CD single

1. "Uncle John from Jamaica" (Hitradio mix) – 3:09
2. "Uncle John from Jamaica" (XXL version) – 5:11

Dutch, Canadian, and Australian maxi-CD single

1. "Uncle John from Jamaica" (Hitradio mix) – 3:09
2. "Uncle John from Jamaica" (XXL version) – 5:11
3. "Uncle John from Jamaica" (karaoke version) – 3:01
4. "Uncle John from Jamaica" (M.I.K.E. remix) – 7:21
5. "Uncle John from Jamaica" (Lock 'N Load remix) – 6:42
6. "Uncle John from Jamaica" (video) – 3:15
7. Making of the video – 3:55

UK CD1

1. "Uncle John from Jamaica" (Hitradio mix) – 3:09
2. "Uncle John from Jamaica" (Lock 'N' Load 'Wake Up Call' remix) – 6:45
3. "Uncle John from Jamaica" (karaoke version) – 3:01
4. "Uncle John from Jamaica" (video)

UK CD2

1. "Uncle John from Jamaica" (XXL version) – 5:11
2. "We're Going to Ibiza!" (Beach extended mix) – 5:22
3. The making of "Uncle John from Jamaica" (video)

UK cassette single

1. "Uncle John from Jamaica" (Hitradio mix) – 3:09
2. "Uncle John from Jamaica" (XXL version) – 5:11
3. "Uncle John from Jamaica" (Lock 'N' Load 'Wake Up Call' remix) – 6:45

== Charts ==
=== Weekly charts ===
Chart (2000)	Peak position
Australia (ARIA)	45
Austria (Ö3 Austria Top 40)	10
Belgium (Ultratop 50 Flanders)	14
Croatia (HRT)	7
Europe (Eurochart Hot 100)	10
France (SNEP)	86
Germany (GfK)	12
Ireland (IRMA)	11
Ireland Dance (IRMA)	7
Italy (Musica e dischi)	38
Netherlands (Dutch Top 40)	7
Netherlands (Single Top 100)	7
New Zealand (Recorded Music NZ)	5
Romania (Romanian Top 100)	4
Scottish Singles Sales (Official Charts)	6
Spain (Promusicae)	16
Sweden (Sverigetopplistan)	12
Switzerland (Schweizer Hitparade)	18
UK Singles (Official Charts)	6

=== Year-end charts ===
Chart (2000)	Position
Belgium (Ultratop 50 Flanders)	86
Ireland (IRMA)	76
Netherlands (Dutch Top 40)	77
Netherlands (Single Top 100)	50
Romania (Romanian Top 100)	47
Sweden (Hitlistan)	94
UK Singles (OCC)	136

== Certifications ==
Region	Certification	Certified units/sales
New Zealand (RMNZ)	Gold	5,000^{*}
^{*} Sales figures based on certification alone.

== Release history ==
Region	Date	Format(s)	Label(s)	Ref.
Europe	29 May 2000	CD	Breakin'; Jive	
United Kingdom	26 June 2000	CD; cassette	Positiva	
Australia	18 September 2000	CD	Breakin'; EMI Australia	
