= Cheekah Bow Bow (That Computer Song) =

2000 single by Vengaboys

Single by Vengaboys featuring Cheekah

from the album The Platinum Album
- Released: 18 September 2000
- Recorded: 1999–2000
- Genre: Eurodance
- Length: 2:53
- Label: EMI
- Songwriter(s): Wessel van Diepen, Dennis van den Driesschen
- Producer(s): Danski, DJ Delmundo

Vengaboys singles chronology
"Uncle John from Jamaica" (2000)	"Cheekah Bow Bow (That Computer Song)" (2000)	"Forever as One" (2001)

"Cheekah Bow Bow (That Computer Song)" is a song by Dutch Eurodance group the Vengaboys. It was released as their eighth United Kingdom single, and their ninth overall. The song charted at number 19 in the United Kingdom (their first single not to achieve a Top 10 placing there). The song was a moderate hit elsewhere in Europe peaking in the Top 40 of several countries.

The single was officially credited to the Vengaboys ft. Cheekah, referring to the animated computer in the music video, which performs the lyrics (all of which are related to computer terminology, but feature some tongue-in-cheek sexual innuendo: e.g. "The way you used your joystick / Has really made my mouse click". However, in the second part of the song, the lyrics portray sexually transmitted diseases once again using computer terminology e.g. "The way you used your joystick / Has really made me feel sick" and "The doctor checked my hard drive / A virus in my archive / My disc was not protected / and now I am infected").

== Track listing ==
1. "Cheekah Bow Bow (That Computer Song) (Hit Radio Mix)"
2. "Cheekah Bow Bow (That Computer Song) (Xxl)"
3. "Cheekah Bow Bow (That Computer Song) (Transa Remix Vocal)"
4. "Cheekah Bow Bow (That Computer Song) (Dillon & Dickins Remix Vocal)"
5. "Cheekah Bow Bow (That Computer Song) (Pulsedriver Remix Vocal)"
6. "Cheekah Bow Bow (That Computer Song) (Dillion & Dickins Remix Instrumental)"
7. "Cheekah Bow Bow (That Computer Song) (Hit Radio Mix Clean Version)"
8. "Cheekah Bow Bow (That Computer Song) (Video)"

== Charts ==
Chart (2000)	Peak position
Austria (Ö3 Austria Top 40)	30
Belgium (Ultratop 50 Flanders)	30
Germany (GfK)	34
Ireland (IRMA)	35
Netherlands (Dutch Top 40)	32
Scotland (OCC)	13
Sweden (Sverigetopplistan)	33
Switzerland (Schweizer Hitparade)	49
UK Singles (OCC)	19
