= Sha-La-La-La-La =

1973 single by Walkers

- Danish cover

Single by Walkers

from the album Greatest Hits
- B-side: "High School Queen"
- Released: 30 March 1973
- Recorded: 1973
- Genre: Glam rock
- Length: 3:00
- Label: Philips
- Songwriters: Torben Lendager, Poul Dehnhardt
- Producer: John Friis

Walkers singles chronology
"(We're Just A) Rock'n'Roll Band" (1973)	"Sha-La-La-La-La" (1973)	"Fire" (1973)

Alternative cover
- German cover

Audio video
- "Sha-La-La-La-La" on YouTube

"Sha-La-La-La-La" is a song by Danish glam rock band Walkers. The song was co-written by band members Torben Lendager and Poul Dehnhardt. It entered the Danish charts at number eight in the last week of March 1973, and peaked at number two after three weeks, after which it disappeared from the charts. The song achieved worldwide exposure after being covered by Dutch Eurodance group Vengaboys.

== Release history ==
It was initially released in Denmark on 30 March 1973 and later in Germany in May. It was later included on their Greatest Hits (1976) album.

== Charts ==
Chart (1973)	Peak position
Denmark (Tracklisten)	2

== Vengaboys version ==
"Shalala Lala"

Single by Vengaboys

from the album The Platinum Album and Music from and Inspired by The Little Vampire
- B-side: "48 Hours"
- Released: 21 February 2000
- Studio: Violent (Studio 4045) (Hilversum, Netherlands)
- Length: 3:33
- Label: Breakin'
- Songwriters: Torben Lendager, Poul Dehnhardt
- Producers: Danski & DJ Delmundo

Vengaboys singles chronology
"Kiss (When the Sun Don't Shine)" (1999)	"Shalala Lala" (2000)	"Uncle John from Jamaica" (2000)

Music video
- "Shalala Lala" on YouTube

Dutch Eurodance group Vengaboys covered the song as "Shalala Lala" and released it on 21 February 2000, as the second single from their third album, The Platinum Album (2000). It remixes the song with typical Vengaboys synth and drum beats, although it keeps substantially the same tempo. The cover became another hit for the band, topping the charts in New Zealand and Romania and peaking within the top five in at least 10 other countries, including Australia, Germany, Ireland, Sweden, and the United Kingdom.

=== Music video ===
The accompanying music video for "Shalala Lala" is modeled after the single cover. It takes place in a fictional Alpine bar named "Wurst & Women". The video primarily focuses on lead vocalist Kim Sasabone performing the song, while women dressed in a skimped-up version of a dirndl dance around. Some men are dressed in lederhosen. The two male group members compete with each other for the affections of Kim Sasabone. After the second verse, the song pauses with a record scratch wherein the two engage in a parody dance battle. The video ends when the bar is raided by the police.

=== Track listings ===
All tracks were written by Torben Lendager and Poul Dehnhardt except "48 Hours", written by Danski & DJ Delmundo.

- European CD1
1. "Shalala Lala" (Hitradio mix) – 3:33
2. "48 Hours" – 4:31
- European CD2 and Australian CD single
1. "Shalala Lala" (Hitradio mix) – 3:33
2. "Shalala Lala" (XXL mix) – 5:40
3. "Shalala Lala" (karaoke version) – 3:30
4. "Shalala Lala" (Alice Deejay remix) – 5:50
5. "48 Hours" – 4:31
6. "Shalala Lala" (banned by the BBC videoclip) – 3:33
- UK CD single
1. "Shalala Lala" (Hitradio mix) – 3:34
2. "Shalala Lala" (Alice Deejay remix) – 5:53
3. "48 Hours" – 4:34
4. "Shalala Lala" (video)
- UK cassette single
1. "Shalala Lala" (Hitradio mix) – 3:34
2. "Shalala Lala" (Alice Deejay remix) – 5:53
3. "48 Hours" – 4:34
- Digital download
1. "Shalala Lala" (Hitradio mix) – 3:33
2. "Shalala Lala" (XXL mix) – 5:40
3. "Shalala Lala" (karaoke version) – 3:30
4. "Shalala Lala" (Alice Deejay remix) – 5:50

=== Charts ===
==== Weekly charts ====
Chart (2000)	Peak position
Australia (ARIA)	4
Austria (Ö3 Austria Top 40)	2
Belgium (Ultratop 50 Flanders)	2
Canada (Nielsen SoundScan)	10
Czech Republic (IFPI)	8
Denmark (IFPI)	6
Europe (Eurochart Hot 100)	3
Finland (Suomen virallinen lista)	17
France (SNEP)	61
Germany (GfK)	3
Ireland (IRMA)	4
Ireland Dance (IRMA)	3
Italy (Musica e dischi)	40
Netherlands (Dutch Top 40)	2
Netherlands (Single Top 100)	2
New Zealand (Recorded Music NZ)	1
Norway (VG-lista)	5
Romania (Romanian Top 100)	1
Scottish Singles Sales (Official Charts)	3
Spain (Promusicae)	8
Sweden (Sverigetopplistan)	5
Switzerland (Schweizer Hitparade)	3
UK Singles (Official Charts)	5

==== Year-end charts ====
Chart (2000)	Position
Australia (ARIA)	36
Austria (Ö3 Austria Top 40)	5
Belgium (Ultratop 50 Flanders)	32
Denmark (IFPI)	40
Europe (Eurochart Hot 100)	24
Germany (Media Control)	17
Ireland (IRMA)	43
Netherlands (Dutch Top 40)	43
Netherlands (Single Top 100)	20
New Zealand (RIANZ)	8
Romania (Romanian Top 100)	10
Sweden (Hitlistan)	33
Switzerland (Schweizer Hitparade)	21
UK Singles (OCC)	64

=== Certifications ===
Region	Certification	Certified units/sales
Australia (ARIA)	Gold	35,000^{^}
Austria (IFPI Austria)	Platinum	50,000^{*}
Belgium (BRMA)	Gold	25,000^{*}
Germany (BVMI)	Platinum	500,000^{^}
New Zealand (RMNZ)	Platinum	30,000^{‡}
Sweden (GLF)	Gold	15,000^{^}
Switzerland (IFPI Switzerland)	Gold	25,000^{^}
United Kingdom (BPI)	Silver	200,000^{^}
^{*} Sales figures based on certification alone.^{^} Shipments figures based on certification alone.^{‡} Sales+streaming figures based on certification alone.

=== Release history ===
Region	Date	Format(s)	Label(s)	Ref.
Europe	21 February 2000	Maxi-CD	Breakin'	
United Kingdom	28 February 2000	CD; cassette	Positiva	
Australia	June 2000	CD	Breakin'	

== Notable cover versions ==
- In 1974, the Cantopop band the Wynners was believed to be the earliest to release a cover version of the song.
- British pop group Dreamhouse released their version of the song, which became a hit in Southeast Asia in 1997.
- Thai singer Prissana "Pookie" Praisaeng also released her version of the song, which over a million copies of cassette sold in 1997.
- Belgian accordionist and singer Matthias Lens recorded a Dutch version of the song for his self-titled album, Matthias Lens, the song peaking at number 46 in Belgium on the Ultratip chart in January 2014.
- Polish duo Mejk recorded a version of the song, which became a summer hit in Poland in 2019.

== See also ==
- List of number-one singles from the 2000s (New Zealand)
- List of Romanian Top 100 number ones of the 2000s
