= Negai no Sora =

"ネガイノソラ"

Single by Emi Tawata
- Released: May 16, 2007
- Genre: Jazz
- Label: AMUSE
- Songwriter(s): Saki, Tamaki Yoshi Haruaki

Emi Tawata singles chronology
"ネガイノソラ" (2007)	"Toki no Sora" (2009)

Negai no Sora was limited single released by Japanese singer Emi Tawata under stage name タワタエミ and indies label AMUSE. This single charted at the #1 spot on the Indies chart in Okinawa. This success gave Emi the chance to go to major label Techesko. Both songs on this single were included on her debut mini-album ∞infinity∞.

== Track list ==
CD
No.	Title	Lyrics	Music	Arrangement	Length
1.	"Negai no Sora (ネガイノソラ; The Sky's Wish)"	Saki	Tamaki Yoshi Haruaki	Tamaki Yoshi Haruaki	4:42
2.	"Music Box"	Emi Tawata	Tomita Keiiti	Tomita Keiiti	5:26
3.	"Nagai no Sora (instrumental)"	Saki	Haruaki	Haruaki	4:44
4.	"Music Box"	Tawata	Keiiti	Keiiti	5:29
