= Dreamhouse (band) =

English dance/pop group (1995–1999)

- From left to right: Paul Barry, Jules Tulley, David Riley

Background information
- Origin: London, England
- Genres: Pop; Eurodance; dance-pop; reggae fusion
- Years active: 1995–1999
- Labels: Trauma; Avex Trax; Chase
- Past members: Paul Barry; David Riley; Jules Tulley

Dreamhouse were an English dance/pop group which consisted of members Paul Barry, David Riley, and Jules Tulley. They released their debut album, first in Asia in 1997 (titled Sha-La-La), and then in Europe and the U.S. in 1998 (self-titled as Dreamhouse). The group released four singles, including a cover version of the Maurice Williams and the Zodiacs song "Stay", which made the UK charts.

== History ==
David Riley, a native of Jamaica, was a collaborator on remixes with artists such as R. Kelly and Fu Schnickens. Jules Tulley worked as a session musician and television presenter, while vocalist/songwriter Paul Barry had been active in the music industry since the late 1970s (he was in the band the Questions). After the trio met in a London recording studio, they formed Dreamhouse and were signed to Trauma Records. Their self-titled debut album mixed dance-oriented covers of 1960s pop songs with original compositions rooted in reggae. The group's rendition of "Stay", the 1960 number-one song by Maurice Williams and the Zodiacs, was released as a UK single in 1995 and reached number 62 on the UK Singles Chart. Three years later, "Stay" was released in the US as the album's lead single.

The Asian release of their album slightly differs from the Europe/US version, as it contains more tracks. Included is the song "Sha La La" (originally by the Walkers) plus two mixes of the song; a mix of "Let's Live for Today" (originally by the Rokes), and the two extra tracks "Walk Like a Man" (originally by the Four Seasons) and "Lightnin' Bar Blues" (originally by Hoyt Axton).

After Dreamhouse, Barry continued his highly successful songwriting career, co-writing hit songs such as "Believe" by Cher, "Hero" and "Bailamos" by Enrique Iglesias and "Let It Go" by James Bay. Tulley joined the Eurodance country group Rednex under the name Scarlet.

== Discography ==
=== Albums ===
- 1997: Sha-La-La (Asian release)
- 1998: Dreamhouse (Europe/US release)

=== Singles ===
Title	Year	Peak chart positions
Title	Year	UK
"Stay"	1995	62
"Hay Que Linda"	1996	—
"Sha La La"	1997	—
"Live for Today"	1998	—
"—" denotes release that did not chart.
