= Kiss (When the Sun Don't Shine) =

1999 single by Vengaboys

Single by Vengaboys

from the album The Platinum Album
- B-side: "Vengababes from Outer Space"
- Released: 26 November 1999
- Studio: Violent (Studio 4045) (Hilversum, Netherlands)
- Genre: Dance
- Length: 3:33
- Label: Breakin'; Positiva
- Songwriters: Danski & DJ Delmundo
- Producers: Danski & DJ Delmundo

Vengaboys singles chronology
| "We're Going to Ibiza" (1999) | "Kiss (When the Sun Don't Shine)" (1999) | "Shalala Lala" (2000) |

Music video
- "Kiss (When the Sun Don't Shine)" on YouTube

"Kiss (When the Sun Don't Shine)" is a song by Dutch Eurodance group Vengaboys, released in November 1999, by Breakin' and Positiva Records, as the lead single from their third studio album, The Platinum Album (2000). The song is both written and produced by Danski & DJ Delmundo and was quite successful on the charts in several countries around the world. It reached number one on the New Zealand Singles Chart and peaked within the top 10 in Canada, Denmark, Flanders, Germany, Iceland, Ireland, the Netherlands, Spain, Sweden, and the United Kingdom. The accompanying music video was directed by Masashi Muto and filmed in Japan.

== Critical reception ==
AllMusic described the song as a "hi-energy dance anthem" in their review of The Platinum Album.

== Music video ==
The music video for "Kiss (When the Sun Don't Shine)" was directed by Masashi Muto and shot in Tokyo, Japan during the Vengaboys Millennium world tour. It features the Para Para, a synchronized dance that originated in Japan.

== Track listings ==
- Dutch CD single
1. "Kiss (When the Sun Don't Shine)" (Hitradio) – 3:31
2. "Kiss (When the Sun Don't Shine)" (DJ Jean Remix) – 8:03
- Dutch maxi-CD single
1. "Kiss (When the Sun Don't Shine)" (Hitradio) – 3:31
2. "Kiss (When the Sun Don't Shine)" (Hitradio XXL) – 5:25
3. "Kiss (When the Sun Don't Shine)" (karaoke) – 3:31
4. "Kiss (When the Sun Don't Shine)" (DJ Jean Remix) – 8:03
5. "Kiss (When the Sun Don't Shine)" (Airscape Remix) – 8:59
6. "Kiss (When the Sun Don't Shine)" (Southside Spinners Remix) – 8:12
7. "Vengababes from Outer Space" – 3:25
8. "Kiss (When the Sun Don't Shine)" (video) – 3:31

Note: A European variant without the video also exists.

- European CD single
1. "Kiss (When the Sun Don't Shine)" (Hitradio) – 3:31
2. "Kiss (When the Sun Don't Shine)" (Hitradio XXL) – 5:25
- UK cassette single
1. "Kiss (When the Sun Don't Shine)" (Hitradio) – 3:33
2. "Kiss (When the Sun Don't Shine)" (XXL mix) – 5:25
3. "Kiss (When the Sun Don't Shine)" (karaoke) – 3:33
- UK CD1
1. "Kiss (When the Sun Don't Shine)" (Hitradio) – 3:33
2. "Kiss (When the Sun Don't Shine)" (XXL mix) – 5:25
3. "Kiss (When the Sun Don't Shine)" (karaoke) – 3:33
4. "Kiss (When the Sun Don't Shine)" (DJ Jean Remix) – 6:53
5. "Kiss (When the Sun Don't Shine)" (video)
- UK CD2
1. "Kiss (When the Sun Don't Shine)" (Hitradio) – 3:33
2. "Kiss (When the Sun Don't Shine)" (Airscape Remix) – 9:01
3. "Boom, Boom, Boom, Boom!!" (Marc van Dale with Enrico Remix) – 6:32
- Australian CD single
1. "Kiss (When the Sun Don't Shine)" (Hitradio) – 3:33
2. "Kiss (When the Sun Don't Shine)" (DJ Jean Remix) – 6:53
3. "Kiss (When the Sun Don't Shine)" (XXL mix) – 5:25
4. "Kiss (When the Sun Don't Shine)" (Airscape Remix) – 9:01
5. "Kiss (When the Sun Don't Shine)" (video)

== Charts ==
=== Weekly charts ===
Weekly chart performance for "Kiss (When the Sun Don't Shine)"
| Chart (1999–2000) | Peak position |
|---|---|
| Australia (ARIA) | 17 |
| Austria (Ö3 Austria Top 40) | 14 |
| Belgium (Ultratop 50 Flanders) | 5 |
| Belgium (Ultratip Bubbling Under Wallonia) | 15 |
| Canada (Nielsen SoundScan) | 6 |
| Canada Dance/Urban (RPM) | 14 |
| Denmark (IFPI) | 5 |
| Europe (Eurochart Hot 100) | 3 |
| France (SNEP) | 53 |
| Germany (GfK) | 10 |
| Iceland (Íslenski Listinn Topp 40) | 10 |
| Ireland (IRMA) | 3 |
| Ireland Dance (IRMA) | 7 |
| Italy (Musica e dischi) | 36 |
| Netherlands (Dutch Top 40) | 2 |
| Netherlands (Single Top 100) | 3 |
| New Zealand (Recorded Music NZ) | 1 |
| Norway (VG-lista) | 20 |
| Scottish Singles Sales (Official Charts) | 1 |
| Spain (Promusicae) | 5 |
| Sweden (Sverigetopplistan) | 3 |
| Switzerland (Schweizer Hitparade) | 14 |
| UK Singles (Official Charts) | 3 |
| US Maxi-Singles Sales (Billboard) | 49 |

=== Year-end charts ===
1999 year-end chart performance for "Kiss (When the Sun Don't Shine)"
| Chart (1999) | Position |
|---|---|
| Netherlands (Dutch Top 40) | 77 |
| Netherlands (Single Top 100) | 45 |
| UK Singles (OCC) | 79 |
| UK Pop (Music Week) | 16 |

2000 year-end chart performance for "Kiss (When the Sun Don't Shine)"
| Chart (2000) | Position |
|---|---|
| Denmark (IFPI) | 50 |
| Europe (Eurochart Hot 100) | 64 |
| Ireland (IRMA) | 50 |
| Netherlands (Dutch Top 40) | 92 |
| Netherlands (Single Top 100) | 83 |
| Sweden (Hitlistan) | 65 |
| UK Singles (OCC) | 152 |

== Certifications ==
Certifications and sales for "Kiss (When the Sun Don't Shine)"
| Region | Certification | Certified units/sales |
|---|---|---|
| New Zealand (RMNZ) | Gold | 5,000^{*} |
| Sweden (GLF) | Gold | 15,000^{^} |
| United Kingdom (BPI) | Silver | 349,500 |
^{*} Sales figures based on certification alone.^{^} Shipments figures based on certification alone.

== Release history ==
Release dates and formats for "Kiss (When the Sun Don't Shine)"
| Region | Date | Format(s) | Label(s) | Ref. |
|---|---|---|---|---|
| Europe | 26 November 1999 | Maxi-CD | Breakin'; Jive | |
| United Kingdom | 6 December 1999 | CD; cassette | Positiva | |
| Australia | 14 February 2000 | CD | EMI Australia | |
| United States | 29 February 2000 | Contemporary hit; rhythmic contemporary radio | Atlantic | |
