= Nakatomi =

Nakatomi may refer to:

- Nakatomi clan, an influential clan in ancient Japan
- Die Hard: Nakatomi Plaza, a first-person shooter video game
- Nakatomi Corporation, a fictional corporation in the motion picture Die Hard and its sequels
- Nakatomi (group), a Dutch happy-hardcore act

See also:

- Fox Plaza (Los Angeles), used as the fictional building Nakatomi Plaza, in the movie Die Hard
