= Edward Synge (archbishop of Tuam) =

Anglican clergyman in the Church of Ireland

The Right Reverend and Right Honourable Edward Synge PC (Ire)
- Archbishop of Tuam
- Church: Church of Ireland
- See: Tuam
- Installed: 1714

Orders
- Consecration: 7 November 1714 by William Palliser

Personal details
- Died: 23 July 1741
- Children: Edward Synge, Nicholas Synge

Styles of Edward Synge
- Reference style: The Most Reverend
- Spoken style: Your Grace or Archbishop

Edward Synge, D.D., M.A., B.A. (1659–1741) was an Anglican clergyman who served in the Church of Ireland as Chancellor of St Patrick's Cathedral, Dublin (1705–1714), Bishop of Raphoe (1714–1716), and Archbishop of Tuam (1716–1741).

Part of a long line of clergy, Synge is also an ancestor of famous playwright John Millington Synge and the composer Mary Helena Synge.

== Biography ==
Born on 6 April 1659 at Inishannon in County Cork, he was the second son of Edward Synge, Bishop of Cork, Cloyne and Ross. He was educated at Christ Church, Oxford and Trinity College, Dublin.

In the late 1600s he was made the rector of Holy Trinity Church, Rathclaren. He was nominated the bishop of Raphoe on 7 October and consecrated on 7 November 1714. He was translated to archbishopric of Tuam by letters patent on 8 June 1716. Synge built a new bishop's palace in Tuam in the late 1710s.

A renowned preacher, his works were frequently published and included an exhortation to frequent communion translated into Welsh. Amongst other achievements he established a dynasty of prominent ecclesiastics and literary figures closely integrated into the Protestant squirearchy in the west of Ireland.

He died in office on 23 July 1741, aged 82.

== Family ==
His father, also named Edward, was the Bishop of Cork, Cloyne, and Ross. He had two sons were Edward and Nicholas, both of whom became bishops in their own right. Edward Synge is a direct ancestor of playwright John Millington Synge.

== Bibliography ==
- Fryde, E. B.; Greenway, D. E.; Porter, S.; Roy, I., eds. (1986). Handbook of British Chronology (3rd, reprinted 2003 ed.). Cambridge: Cambridge University Press. ISBN 0-521-56350-X.
- Clesham, Brigid (2013). "The Province of Armagh: Tuam, Killala and Achonry". In McAuley, Alicia; Costecalde, Dr. Claude; Walker, Prof. Brian (eds.). The Church of Ireland: An illustrated history. Dublin: Booklink. p. 262. ISBN 978 1 906886 56 1.

Church of Ireland titles
Preceded by Thomas Lindsay	Bishop of Raphoe; 1714–1716	Succeeded by Nicholas Forster
Preceded by John Vesey	Archbishop of Tuam; 1716–1741	Succeeded by Josiah Hort
