= Sweet Soul Love =

Studio album by Emi Tawata
- Released: March 18, 2009
- Genre: R&B, Soul
- Label: Techesko

Emi Tawata chronology
LOVE&PEACE (2008)	Sweet Soul Love (2009)

Sweet Soul Love is the third mini-album from Japanese singer Emi Tawata under the label Techesko. The album managed to reach the No. 284 spot on the Oricon ranking and charted for 1 week. This third mini-album shows another side of Emi Tawatas style of music. This mini-album is more of the smooth R&B and Soul while her other 2 mini-albums were more of the Jazz kind. This mini-album contains 2 covers: one is from the well-known Japanese Jazz-singer Bird and one is from the famous reggae-singer Bob Marley

== Track list ==
CD
No.	Title	Lyrics	Music	Arrangement	Length
1.	"Baby Come Close To Me"	Emi Tawata	Emi Tawata	COLDFEET	4:25
2.	"Only Need A Little Light"	Emi Tawata	Emi Tawata	Mori Toshiyuki	4:57
3.	"Do You Understand My Love"	Emi Tawata	LENSEI	Nobuyuki Nakajima	5:52
4.	"甘く甘くささやいて"	bird	Oosawa Nobukazu / MONDAY Mitsuru	YANAGIMAN	5:32
5.	"Turn Your Lights Down Low"	Bob Marley	Bob Marley	Mori Toshiya	4:50
