= Sing You =

∞infinity∞

EP by Emi Tawata
- Released: September 26, 2012
- Label: Sony Music Entertainment

Emi Tawata chronology
Sings Of Souls Live 2010 (2010)	∞infinity∞ (2012)

Sing You is the fourth mini-album from Japanese singer Emi Tawata but the first under the label Sony Music Entertainment. It is the first release after 2 years. There are 2 different version available: A limited CD+DVD version and a CD-only version. In the music video of "Ne", Japanese actress Satomi Ishihara, who was part of the Romeo&Juliet play in Japan 2012, plays the lead role. In the chorus of the third song on the album, "Namida ga Deta", Japanese singer-songwriter Hanah supports the background vocals.

== Track list ==
CD
No.	Title	Lyrics	Music	Arrangement	Length
1.	"Ne (ねぇ; Hey)"	Onoe Bun	Takayuki Ota	Takayuki Ota
2.	"Aishiteru Nante Ienai (アイシテルなんて言えない; I can't say I love You)"	Daisuke Mori	Natsumi Kobayashi	Natsumi Kobayashi
3.	"Namida ga Deta (涙がでた; And Tears Came)"	Onoe Bun	Marayu Manabu	Marayu Manabu
4.	"A winter day"	Onoe Bun	Takayuki Ota	Takayuki Ota
5.	"Taisetsu no Mono (大切なもの; Important Things)"	Onoe Bun	Yu Shimabukuro (BEGIN)	Takayuki Ota
6.	"Ningyo (人魚; Mermaid)"	NOKKO	Kyohei Tsusumi	Shikei Kamimura
