= Edward Synge (bishop of Cork, Cloyne and Ross) =

Styles of Edward Synge
- Reference style: The Right Reverend
- Spoken style: My Lord or Bishop

Edward Synge
- Born: 3 July 1621
- Died: 1678 (aged 56–57)

Edward Synge (died 1678) was an Anglican clergyman who served in the Church of Ireland as the Bishop of Limerick, Ardfert and Aghadoe (1661–1663) and subsequently the Bishop of Cork, Cloyne and Ross (1663–1678).

A native of Bridgnorth in Shropshire, England, he was educated at Drogheda Grammar School and Trinity College, Dublin. While he was the Dean of Elphin, he was nominated the bishop of Limerick on 6 August 1660 and consecrated on 27 January 1661. He became the bishop of Limerick, Ardfert and Aghadoe when the Anglican sees of Limerick and Ardfert and Aghadoe were united in 1661. He was translated to bishopric of Cork, Cloyne and Ross by letters patent on 21 December 1663.

He died in office on 22 December 1678.

His older brother George Synge (1594–1653) had been bishop of Cloyne (1638–1652) before ejection in the Civil War. His son Edward (1659–1741) and his grandsons Edward (1691–1762) and Nicholas (1693–1771), also became bishops.

== Bibliography ==
- Fryde, E. B.; Greenway, D. E.; Porter, S.; Roy, I., eds. (1986). Handbook of British Chronology (3rd, reprinted 2003 ed.). Cambridge: Cambridge University Press. ISBN 0-521-56350-X.

Church of Ireland titles
Preceded by Robert Sibthorp	Bishop of Limerick; 1660–1661	Title united with Ardfert and Aghadoe
New title	Bishop of Limerick, Ardfert and Aghadoe; 1661–1663	Succeeded by William Fuller
Preceded by Michael Boyle	Bishop of Cork, Cloyne and Ross; 1663–1678	Succeeded by Edward Wetenhall (Bishop of Cork and Ross)
Preceded by Michael Boyle	Bishop of Cork, Cloyne and Ross; 1663–1678	Succeeded by Patrick Sheridan (Bishop of Cloyne)
