= Nicholas Forster =

Irish Anglican bishop

Nicholas Foster was an 18th-century Anglican bishop in Ireland.

Foster was educated at Trinity College, Dublin. He was nominated Bishop of Killaloe on 7 October 1714; and consecrated on 7 November that year. He was translated to Raphoe by letters patent on 8 June 1716. He died in office on 5 June 1743

A fellow of Trinity College Dublin, he gave money to the College to establish the Bishop Forster Premium prizes for Divinity.

Religious titles
Preceded by Thomas Vesey	Bishop of Killaloe; 1714-1716	Succeeded by Charles Carr
Preceded by Edward Synge	Bishop of Raphoe; 1716–1739	Succeeded by William Barnard
