= Sing Sing (disambiguation) =

Sing Sing is a prison in New York State.

Sing Sing may also refer to:

== Music ==
- Sing-Sing (band), a British band
- Sing Sing (1984–1994), a 1997 album by The Honeymoon Killers
- "Sing Sing" (song), a 1978 song by Gaz
- "Sing Sing", a song from the Marianas Trench album Masterpiece Theatre

== Other uses ==
- Sing Sing (1983 film), a 1983 Italian comedy film
- Sing Sing (2023 film), a 2023 American drama film
- Sing Sing (horse) (1957-72), a British thoroughbred racehorse
- Sing-sing (New Guinea), a cultural event in Papua New Guinea
- Sing Sing, historic name of the village of Ossining, New York

== See also ==
- Sing (disambiguation)
- Sing Sing Sing (disambiguation)
