= Sing Sing Sing =

Sing Sing Sing may refer to:

- "Sing, Sing, Sing (song)", 1936 big band song by Louis Prima, famously performed by Benny Goodman
- Sing Sing Sing (album), live album by Mel Tormé
- Sing! Sing! Sing!, 1987 album by John Pizzarelli
- Sing, Sing, Sing (TV series), Australian music television series in the early 1960s

== See also ==
- Sing (disambiguation)
- Sing Sing (disambiguation)
