= Love & Peace (Emi Tawata album) =

LOVE&PEACE

Studio album by Emi Tawata
- Released: July 23, 2008
- Genre: Jazz, funk, reggae
- Label: Techesko

Emi Tawata chronology
∞infinity∞ (2008)	LOVE&PEACE (2008)	Sweet Soul Love (2009)

LOVE&PEACE is the second mini-album from Japanese singer Emi Tawata under the label Techesko. The album managed to reach the #204 spot on the Oricon ranking and charted for 2 weeks. The mini-album had a collaboration song with DJ KAWASAKI named INTO YOU. The leading song FLOWER was a theme song for television network series がっちりマンデー!!

== Track listing ==
CD
No.	Title	Lyrics	Music	Arrangement	Length
1.	"FLOWERS"	Emi Tawata	Oosawa Nobukazu	Oosawa Nobukazu	3:40
2.	"INTO YOU"	Emi Tawata	KAORU KAWASAKI、SWING-O	KAORU KAWASAKI、SWING-O	7:15
3.	"eternity"	Emi Tawata	Matsumoto Kiyoshi	Nosaki Ryouta (Jazztronik)	5:58
4.	"MISERY"	Emi Tawata	Mori Toshiyuki	Mori Toshiyuki	5:07
5.	"Shiosai (潮騒)"	Yoshida Minako	Yamashita Tatsuo	Nobuyuki Nakajima	5:03
