= Holy Trinity Church, Rathclaren =

Anglican church in Cork, Ireland

Coordinates: 51.65692°N 8.70099°W

Holy Trinity Church
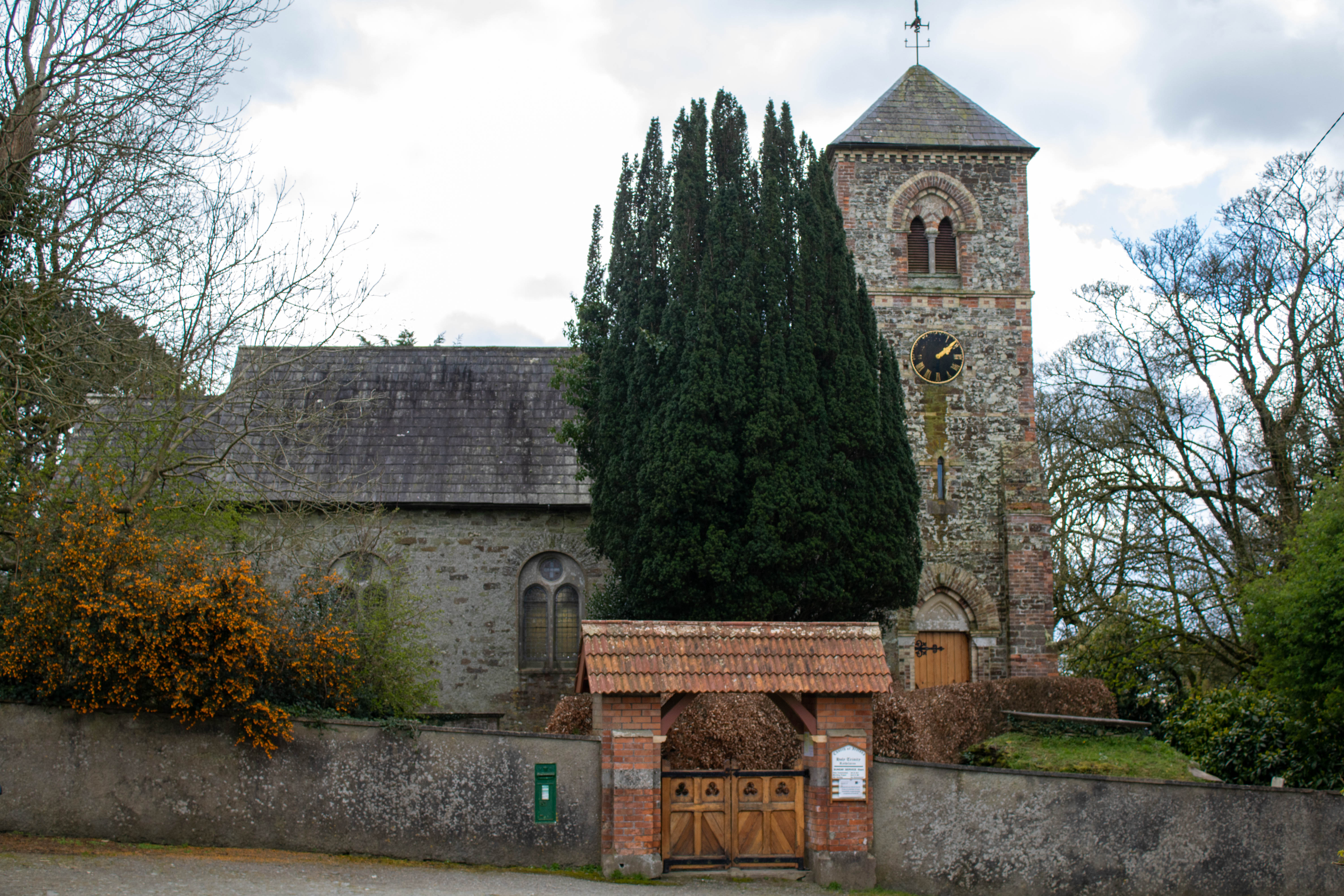
- Holy Trinity Church
- Country: Ireland
- Denomination: Church of Ireland
- Previous denomination: Roman Catholic
- Website: http://cork.anglican.org/places/bandon-union/

Architecture
- Style: Various, principally Neoclassical and Gothic Revival

Holy Trinity Church is a small Anglican church located in Rathclaren, County Cork, Ireland. It was completed in roughly 1650. It is dedicated to the Holy Trinity. It is part of the Bandon Union of Parishes in the Diocese of Cork, Cloyne, and Ross.

== History ==
The church either the third and or possibly the fourth church to have served the parish of Rathclaren, with the earliest church dating to at least 1291. There a ruins of the foundation of a middle age church opposite the road from Holy Trinity Church.

The parish, originally Roman Catholic, was reformed in the late 1500s.

The current church was built sometime around 1650. Significant work was carried out on the building in 1835, with help from a grant given by the Ecclesiastical Commissioners. A large tower was added in the 19th century.

The current ceiling of the church was installed in the 1930s, while at the same time the wooden frames that surrounded the round-headed windows were replaced with concrete plate tracery.

== Architecture ==
The church has a mixed architectural style, primarily of neoclassicism and Venetian Gothic Revivalism, along with some elements of Hiberno-Romanesque revival architecture. The main body of the church is built in the classical style, the windows are not original to the building and have neo-gothic elements, whilst the belfry is designed in the Hiberno-Romanesque style. The building's lychgate entrance is considered unusual, and is associated with the English style of church building.

In 1876, Ludlow Sealy gifted the church a clock which is now installed in the tower. The tower was rebuilt that same year, adding the coloured brick dressings and angle buttresses to the tower, along with the clock.

A ring of ten tubular bells are hung in the tower. Installed in 1896, they were installed in memory of members of the Sealy family.

The church features a memorial to Colonel Sampson Stawell, who died in 1849. It comprises a marble plaque flanked by soldiers, and was made by Thomas Gaffin.

== Notable clergy members ==
Edward Synge served as rector of the parish in the late 1600s, and later became the Archbishop of Tuam in 1716. Upon being made the Bishop of Raphoe in 1714, Synge donated a silver communion chalice to Rathclaren church.

Richard Clarke served as rector of the parish from 1984 to 1993, before being made the Dean of Cork. In 1996 he was promoted to Bishop of Meath and Kildare.
