= William Fuller (bishop) =

Irish bishop

William Fuller (1608–1675) was an English churchman.

He was dean of St Patrick's Cathedral, Dublin (1660), bishop of Limerick (1663), and bishop of Lincoln (1667). He was also the friend of Samuel Pepys and John Evelyn.

== Life ==
He was son of Thomas Fuller, a merchant of London, by his wife, Lucy, daughter of Simon Cannon, citizen and merchant taylor. He was born in London, and was educated at Westminster School, from which he went to Magdalen Hall, Oxford, as a commoner, about 1626, migrating to Edmund Hall, at which he took the degree of B.C.L, about 1632. After taking holy orders he was appointed one of the chaplains or petty canons of Christ Church Cathedral.

He was presented by the king to the rectory of St. Mary Woolchurch in the city of London on 30 June 1641, and resigned it on 16 December of the same year, in which he was also appointed to the rectory of Ewhurst, Sussex. When Charles I was besieged in Oxford in 1645, he became chaplain to Edward, Lord Lyttelton. In the parliamentary visitation of the University of Oxford, he lost his position at Christ Church. During the Protectorate, he supported himself by keeping a school at Twickenham, with the scholar William Wyatt. Samuel Pepys, though much younger, called him "my dear friend", and there are numerous references to Fuller in the Diary. He was also a friend of John Evelyn.

On 3 July 1660, after the Restoration, Fuller was appointed to the deanery of St. Patrick's Dublin; he received the degree of D.C.L. Oxford on 2 August, by virtue of a letter of the chancellor, and also was admitted D.D. of Cambridge. Pepys in his Diary records congratulating Fuller. Other preferments in the Irish church followed: the treasurership of Christ Church, Dublin, on 11 July 1661, the chancellorship of Dromore in 1662, and finally the bishopric of Limerick, to which he was consecrated in Christ Church Cathedral on 20 March 1664, with permission to hold his deanery in commendam for two years. Six months after he became dean of St. Patrick's, on 27 January 1661, twelve bishops were consecrated at one time for as many vacant sees in St. Patrick's Cathedral by Archbishop John Bramhall, and Fuller wrote an anthem for the occasion entitled Quum denuo exaltavit Dominus coronam.

During the time he was dean of St. Patrick's he spent most of his time in England, but took interest in the repair of the Lincoln Cathedral. He successfully intrigued for a vacancy, and was elected Bishop of Lincoln on 17 September 1667. The episcopal palace at Lincoln had been ruined during the civil wars, so he occupied a mansion-house in the cathedral close during his visits to Lincoln. He worked to repair the cathedral and was buried there, after he died at Kensington. Fuller was not married. One of his sisters, Catherine, married John Bligh, citizen and salter of London, afterwards of Rathmore, co. Meath, M.P. for Athboy, the founder of the family of the Earls of Darnley.

== Settings ==
Several poems by Fuller were set by Henry Purcell. His 1688 song An Evening Hymn (Z.193) is one of the most well-known.

Now that the sun has veil'd his Light,
And bid the World good Night;
To the soft Bed my Body I dispose,
But where shall my Soul repose?
Dear God, even in thy Arms, and can there be
Any so sweet Security?
Then to thy Rest, O my Soul, and singing, praise
The Mercy that prolongs thy Days.
Hallelujah.

The first four lines were also used by the 1980s punk band Crass as the opening for their song Mother Earth with the last four lines being quoted at the end.

Church of England titles
Preceded by Edward Synge	Bishop of Limerick, Ardfert and Aghadoe; 1664–1667	Succeeded by Francis Marsh
Preceded by Benjamin Laney	Bishop of Lincoln; 1667–1675	Succeeded by Thomas Barlow
