= Emi Tawata =

Emi Tawata 多和田えみ
- Born: Tawata Emi; June 26, 1984 (age 42); Okinawa, Japan
- Origin: Japan
- Genres: Soul, R&B, jazz, blues, funk
- Occupations: Singer, songwriter
- Years active: 2007–present
- Labels: Nancle Label (2007–2008); Techesko (2008–2012); Sony Music Entertainment (2012–present)
- Website: tawataemi.com

Emi Tawata (多和田えみ, Tawata Emi), born on June 26, 1984, in Okinawa, is a Japanese singer. Her music is a mix of soul, R&B, jazz, blues and funk.

== Biography ==
=== Early career ===
In early 2005, Emi Tawata traveled to Vancouver to study language. During her time there she became a member of a street jazz band and inspired by the experience, decided to become a singer.

Upon returning to Japan in 2006 she started composing her own songs, debuting them in a small live house in Okinawa. In April 2007 she participated in a music audition sponsored by MSN and won the Special Jury Prize. This gave her the opportunity to meet Japanese (Jazz) producers like Coldfeet and Ryota Nozaki (Jazztronik) and led to the release of her debut single Negai No Sora. Negai No Sora peaked at the No. 1 spot on the Okinawa Indies chart, under name タワタエミ (Tawata Emi). The track was later released on her debut mini-album Infinity under a newly formed label named Techesko. The mini-album charted at the No. 110 spot on the Oricon chart.

=== Major label debut and beyond (2008–2010) ===
A few months after the release of ∞infinity∞ she released another mini-album named Love&Peace which included a collaboration with DJ Kawasaki titled Into You. Shortly after her second mini-album plans were made for her tour Emi Tawata & The Soul Infinity: Sweet Soul Tour 2009. During her tour, on March 18, 2009, Emi released her 3rd mini-album Sweet Soul Love. Along with this mini-album came a collaboration with the popular apparel brand Soulsmania. On May 12, 2009, her official website announced Emi's first Maxi-single Toki no Sora would be released on June 24. The leading song is an ending song from the TV quiz show Sekai fushigi hakken and theme song for the roadshow movie Chikujou se Yo. On June 30 it was announced that Emi would be featured in two songs from the popular techno twins Ryukuydisko, Starlight Waltz feat. 多和田えみ and てぃんさぐぬ花 feat. 多和田えみ. Both songs are included on the album Pleasure.

On August 22, 2009, Emi announced on her blog that she would release her first full-length album Sings along with a single Namida no Oto on November 4. She supported the releases with a tour titled Emi Tawata & The Soul Infinity: Sings of Souls live 2010. On January 23, 2010, Emi announced a new single release for March 23 named Lovely Day. After a long period of touring through Japan came the release of a live album and DVD (Sings Of Souls Live 2010) released on June 23.

=== Hiatus, label transfer and new mini-album ===
After being on a unannounced hiatus for 1 year, Emi's official website announced that she would be the singer during the Romeo&Julia play that would tour through Japan. On July 14, 2012, she announced that there will be a new mini-album released on September 26, 2012, named "Sing You". This would be the first album to be released under the label Sony Music Entertainment. In the announcement she confessed that the new songs "were a new challenge for her".

== Discography ==
=== Albums ===
1. 2009 November 4 – Sings No. 111 on Oricon
2. 2010 June 23 – Sings Of Souls Live 2010

=== EPs ===
1. 2008 April 23 – Infinity No. 110 on Oricon
2. 2008 July 23 – Love&Peace No. 204 on Oricon
3. 2009 March 18 – Sweet Soul Love No. 284 on Oricon
4. 2012 September 26 – Sing You

=== Singles ===
1. 2007 May 15 – Negai no Sora (indie label) No. 1 Indies Chart Okinawa
2. 2009 June 24 – Toki no Sora
3. 2009 November 4 – Namida no Oto
4. 2010 March 23 – Lovely Day No. 182 on Oricon
