= Rocket to Uranus =

Single by Vengaboys featuring Perez Hilton
- Released: 4 June 2010
- Recorded: 2010
- Genre: Hi-NRG, Eurodance
- Length: 3:52
- Label: Strictly Rhythm
- Songwriters: Danski, DJ Delmundo, Anders Wollbeck, Mattias Lindblom
- Producers: Danski, DJ Delmundo, Vengaboys

Vengaboys singles chronology
"Forever as One (Vengaboys song)" (2001)	"Rocket to Uranus" (2010)	"Hot Hot Hot" (2013)

"Rocket to Uranus" is a 2010 single by the Dutch Eurodance group Vengaboys, although it only charted in their home country. It was released as a single on 4 June 2010 in the Netherlands. In the UK, the track was initially released as a remix on the dance compilation album Clubland 17. It was later released there as a single digitally with no promotion.

The song was written by a team consisting of Vengaboys, Danski, DJ Delmundo, Mattias Lindblom and Anders Wollbeck (Vacuum). The soon to be released video was shot in February and March 2010 in studios in London and L.A. and was directed by Andy Soup, known for his work with Basement Jaxx and Scissor Sisters.

The video was rumoured to feature a cameo by Lady Gaga, but that was denied by the Vengaboys through their Twitter account. American celebrity blogger Perez Hilton was then the rumoured international star to appear in the video. According to a press release on their website, "he actually wrote some of the funniest lines of the song".

A club remix for the song was provided by British producers Almighty.

== Track listing ==
Remix EP

1. "Rocket to Uranus" (Hitradio with Perez) 3:54
2. "Rocket to Uranus" (Hitradio without Perez) 3:52
3. "Rocket to Uranus" (Riptide Remix) 5:38
4. "Rocket to Uranus" (Schmid Remix) 5:22
5. "Rocket to Uranus" (Superbug Remix) 5:26
6. "Rocket to Uranus" (Andronik Spacedisco Remix) 7:31

== Music video ==
The video premiered on 6 June 2010 on Dutch music channel TMF. The video begins with a voice announcing "In Vengavision 3DD, Rocket to Uranus". Vengaboys are then shown on the spaceship with occasional flashes of the group arriving and dancing on Uranus. They are welcomed by the inhabitants who join in dancing. The scene then shifts to Phalzistor (cameo by Pete Burns) who, after seeing the Vengaboys, wants them "Dead or Alive" and wishes to destroy the planet. The Vengaboys respond to the turmoil on Uranus by revealing their torpedo-like sides of the rocket, to be speakers which play "Venga-sound". Phalzistor's minions stop fighting and start dancing. He then teleports to the planet to regain control. Once he realises it's in vain, the "Venga-sound" forces his head to explode. Everybody on the planet proceeds to dance in celebration.

There are two versions: One in 2D (the regular video), and one in stereoscopic 3D (where red/cyan glasses are required). The video itself is the same in both versions.

== Charts ==
Chart (2010)	Peak position
Netherlands (Dutch Top 40)	21
Netherlands (Single Top 100)	7
