= Mary Helena Synge =

- Born: 8 July 1840
- Died: 5 February 1917 (aged 76)
- Occupations: Composer; singer
- Instrument: Piano

Mary Helena Synge (8 July 1840 – 5 February 1917) was an Irish composer, pianist, and singer who spent many years in England, where she died.

Synge was born in Parsonstown to Margaret Jemima Saunders, Edward Synge, and a family of musicians and writers descended from the Archbishop Edward Synge. Her cousin was the author John Millington Synge. Some of their correspondence is archived at Trinity College Dublin.

Synge studied piano and singing at the Royal Conservatory of Brussels. She gave piano recitals throughout Ireland and England. A recital in London on 10 July 1883, received favourable reviews. She performed in Cork later that year, and at the Antient Concert Rooms in Dublin in 1893.

Synge’s music was published by Ashdown & Parry, Weekes & Company, and Year Book Press of London. Her compositions include:

== Piano ==
- Album Leaves (collection)
- Danse Caprice
- Impromptu
- Kalakaua Gavotte
- Royal Marine Artillery Gavotte

== Vocal ==
- “Eternity”
- “Farewell” (text by Miss E. Barnard)
- “Fate”
- “Happy Children”
- “Spring” (for three voices)
- “Spring Story” (text by Emmoren)
- “Time”
