= Sings (Emi Tawata album) =

Studio album by Emi Tawata
- Released: November 4, 2009
- Recorded: 2008–2009
- Genre: Soul, R&B, jazz, blues, funk
- Label: Techesko

Emi Tawata chronology
Sings (2009)	Sings Of Souls Live 2010 (2010)

Sings is the first album to be released by Emi Tawata under label Techesko The CD contains several songs she had released before on an EP or a single. The songs "Naturally" and "Into You" have a complete new arrangement thanks to the Soul Infinity band. Also "Can't Reach" has been remixed and has new vocals. The album includes a cover of "Joy To The World" which was used in the Suzuki Splash commercial. The CD+DVD version is limited to 10,000 copies. The DVD track list was released on 1 October. The name of the DVD is Sings: Soulgraphy2006-2009 and includes all her released PVs, several interviews and live performances. The album charted on the weekly Oricon charts at #111 and sold 1,699 copies so far.

== Track listing ==
CD
No.	Title	Writer(s)	Producer(s)	Length
1.	"Overture" (Theme of Techesko)	Emi Tawata	Tomita Keiiti
2.	"Baby Come Close To Me"	Tawata	Coldfeet
3.	"Naturally" (The Soul Infinity album version)	Tawata, Lori Fine	Koichiro Abe for The Soul Infinity
4.	"Musing"	Tawata, Saigenji	Saigenji
5.	"Only Need a Little Light"	Tawata	Mori Toshiyuki
6.	"Ai Neiro (愛音色, Love Tones)"	Tawata	Yanagiman
7.	"Eternity"	Tawata, Matsumoto Kiyoshi	Nosaki Ryouta (Jazztronik)
8.	"Toki no Sora (時の空, Sky's Time)"	Tawata, Saigenji	Toshiyuki Mori
9.	"Tsuki no Uta (月のうた, The Moon Song)"	Tawata, Daisuke Kawaguchi	Tomita Keiiti
10.	"Namida no Oto (涙ノ音, The Sound of Tears)"	Yoko Kuzuya	Nobuyuki Nakajima
11.	"Negai no Sora"	Saki, Tamaki Yoshi Haruaki	Haruaki
12.	"Flowers"	Tawata, Oosawa Nobukazu	Nobukazu
13.	"Dance to the Music / Joy to the World"	Sylverster Stewart / Hoyt Wayne Axton	Koichiro Abe for The Soul Infinity
14.	"Into You" (The Soul Infinity album version)	Emi Tawata, DJ Kawasaki, Swing-O	Koichiro Abe for The Soul Infinity
15.	"Can't Reach" (album version)	Tawata	Yanagiman
16.	"One Love"	Daisuke Kawaguchi	Mori Toshiyuki

DVD
No.	Title	Length
1.	"Overture -Introducing Emi Tawata-"
2.	"Negai no Sora" (digest & interview)
3.	"Ellie My Love" (live, 07.6.22 at Tokyo Akasaka MOVE)
4.	"Interview for Yura Yura"
5.	"Yura Yura" (video clip)
6.	"DJ Kawasaki feat.Emi Tawata Into You" (digest)
7.	"Interview for Naturally"
8.	"Naturally" (video clip)
9.	"MC" (live, 08.4.19 -Japan Reggae Festa 2008-)
10.	"Can't Reach" (video clip)
11.	"Eternity" (live clip, 08.5.9 at Tokyo・Shibuya)
12.	"Misery" (live clip, 08.7.11 Liquid Room -DIVA2008-)
13.	"Interview for Flowers"
14.	"Flowers" (video clip)
15.	"Dance to the Music / Joy to the World" (live & interview, 08.11.24 -Soul Revue 2008-)
16.	"Only Need a Little Light" (live clip, 08.11.24 -Soul Revue 2008-)
17.	"Interview for Baby Come Close to Me"
18.	"Baby Come Close to Me" (video clip)
19.	"Sweet Soul Tour 2009」Live Digest Musing: えみBeats -Okinawa Chatan Salt & Pepper-"
20.	"Interview & Digest for Toki no Sora"
21.	"MC 〜 Toki no Sora (Live) 09.6.27 -Carnival Day 2009-"
22.	"Toki no Sora" (video clip)
23.	"Musing with Saigenji (Live) Osaka 09.8.20 -Release party Toki no Sora-"
24.	"The Soul Infinity Recording" (document)
25.	"Interview for Namida no Oto"
26.	"Namida no Oto" (video clip)
27.	"Interview for Sings"
28.	"Ending: Sings of Souls live 2010"
