= Infinity (Emi Tawata EP) =

∞infinity∞

EP by Emi Tawata
- Released: April 23, 2008
- Genre: Jazz, Funk, Reggae
- Label: Techesko

Emi Tawata chronology
∞infinity∞ (2008)	LOVE&PEACE (2008)

∞infinity∞ is the first mini-album from Japanese singer Emi Tawata under the label Techesko. The album managed to reach the #110 spot on the Oricon ranking and charted for 4 weeks. This mini-album includes a reggae cover of Fumido's "Yura Yura." and the song Negai no Sora which managed to get the #1 spot on the Indies chart as a single.

== Track list ==
CD
No.	Title	Lyrics	Music	Arrangement	Length
1.	"Naturally"	Emi Tawata	LORI FINE	COLDFEET	4:12
2.	"Music Box"	Emi Tawata	Tomita Keiiti	Tomita Keiiti	5:26
3.	"ゆらゆら (Yura Yura)"	Wataru Kazuhisa	Wataru Kazuhisa	Mori Toshiya	4:43
4.	"CAN'T REACH"	Emi Tawata	Emi Tawata	YANAGIMAN	5:31
5.	"ネガイノソラ (Nagai no Sora)"	Saki	Tamaki Yoshi Haruaki	Tamaki Yoshi Haruaki	4:42
