= The Walkers (Danish band) =

Danish band

Walkers
- Origin: Denmark
- Genres: Glam rock
- Years active: 1968–1977; 2000–present
- Members: Torben Lendager; Gert Michelsen
- Past members: Jan Kanstrup Hansen; Poul Dehnhardt

The Walkers were a Danish glam rock band featuring singer-songwriter Torben Lendager, guitarist Gert Michelsen, drummer-lyricist Poul Dehnhardt and bassist Jan Kanstrup Hansen. The band was founded in 1968 and broke up in 1977. They made several comebacks after their initial breakup.

Walkers' hits include song "Little Kitty", which was covered in 2000 by another Danish band, Creamy, and "Sha-La-La-La-La", which was covered the same year by Vengaboys, and also in 1974 by Cantopop band the Wynners.

== Discography ==
=== Studio albums ===
List of studio albums with selected chart positions and track lists
Title	Album details	Peak chart positions	Track list
Title	Album details	DNK	Track list
Walkers	Released: November 24, 1972; Format: LP; Label: Philips	—	Side A: No. / Title / Writer(s) / Length; 1. / "Dabadio-Dabadie" / Daniel Vangarde, Jean Kluger, Franck Gérald, Nelly Byl / 2:19; 2. / "(We're Just A) Rock 'N' Roll Band" / Torben Lendager, Poul Dehnhardt / 3:26; 3. / "Raggy Lady" / T. Lendager, P. Dehnhardt / 3:24; 4. / "Springtime" / T. Lendager, P. Dehnhardt / 3:25; 5. / "Sunny Honey Days in Terreno" / T. Lendager, P. Dehnhardt / 3:23; 6. / "Rosie" / T. Lendager, P. Dehnhardt / 2:35; Total length: / / / 18:32; Side B: No. / Title / Writer(s) / Length; 1. / "Sunshine" / T. Lendager, P. Dehnhardt / 2:59; 2. / "Set Me Free" / Dennis Dehnhardt, P. Dehnhardt / 3:29; 3. / "For You, Heaven" / T. Lendager, P. Dehnhardt / 4:02; 4. / "Take Me Back San Francisco" / P. Dehnhardt / 3:07; 5. / "Country Sideway" / T. Lendager, P. Dehnhardt / 1:28; 6. / "Marry Me" / T. Lendager / 3:26; Total length: / / / 18:31
A Show Just for You	Released: June 7, 1974; Format: LP; Label: Philips	1	Side A: No. / Title / Writer(s) / Length; 1. / "Face the Reality" (Instrumental) / Torben Lendager / 3:10; 2. / "Let's Go, Let's Go, Let's Rock 'N' Roll" / T. Lendager, Poul Dehnhardt / 2:33; 3. / "I'm Your Rock'N'Roller" / T. Lendager, P. Dehnhardt / 3:15; 4. / "California Groupie" / T. Lendager, P. Dehnhardt / 3:45; 5. / "Little Kitty" / T. Lendager, P. Dehnhardt / 2:16; 6. / "Dearest Irene" / T. Lendager, P. Dehnhardt / 3:10; Total length: / / / 18:09; Side B: No. / Title / Writer(s) / Length; 1. / "I Do the Show Just For You" / T. Lendager, P. Dehnhardt / 3:33; 2. / "Where Did You Go" / Jan Kanstrup, P. Dehnhardt / 2:47; 3. / "Face the Reality" (Vokal) / T. Lendager, P. Dehnhardt / 3:15; 4. / "The Nightmare" / T. Lendager, P. Dehnhardt / 6:28; 5. / "Green Grass and Sunshine" / T. Lendager, P. Dehnhardt / 2:38; Total length: / / / 18:41
Forever Together	Released: December 11, 1975; Format: LP; Label: Philips	6	Side A: No. / Title / Writer(s) / Length; 1. / "Forever Together" / Torben Lendager, Poul Dehnhardt / 3:42; 2. / "Baby Love" / T. Lendager, P. Dehnhardt / 3:22; 3. / "Saving Your Kisses for Saturday" / T. Lendager, P. Dehnhardt / 3:22; 4. / "Turn Around and Love Me" / T. Lendager, P. Dehnhardt / 2:59; 5. / "Sundown" / T. Lendager, P. Dehnhardt / 4:11; 6. / "Starchaser" / T. Lendager, P. Dehnhardt / 3:16; Total length: / / / 20:58; Side B: No. / Title / Writer(s) / Length; 1. / "Dance On (Disco Darling)" / T. Lendager, P. Dehnhardt, Anthony Eyers / 4:10; 2. / "Fight On" / T. Lendager, P. Dehnhardt / 4:18; 3. / "Let's Get it Together" / T. Lendager, P. Dehnhardt / 4:36; 4. / "Who is Right, Who is Wrong" / T. Lendager, P. Dehnhardt / 3:54; 5. / "Aeroplane Song" / T. Lendager, P. Dehnhardt / 3:15; Total length: / / / 20:13
Reinstalled	Released: January 27, 2003; Formats: CD, digital download; Label: CBM Entertainment Brugger & Co. KEG	36	Tracks: No. / Title / Writer(s) / Length; 1. / "Fire" (2003) / Torben Lendager, Poul Dehnhardt / 3:32; 2. / "Every Little Move" / T. Lendager, P. Dehnhardt / 3:29; 3. / "Rain Until September" / T. Lendager, P. Dehnhardt, Torbern Eilersen / 3:14; 4. / "Part of my Life" / T. Lendager, P. Dehnhardt / 3:23; 5. / "Yes or No" / T. Lendager, P. Dehnhardt / 3:40; 6. / "Sunshine Angel" / T. Lendager, P. Dehnhardt / 3:30; 7. / "The First One to Know" / T. Lendager, P. Dehnhardt, Chris Paulsen / 3:17; 8. / "Bad Boyz" / T. Lendager, P. Dehnhardt / 4:03; 9. / "Forever Together" (2003) / T. Lendager, P. Dehnhardt, Anthony Eyers / 3:34; 10. / "Baby, Now That I've Found You" / MacLeod, MacCauley / 3:23; 11. / "Regnvejr i september" / T. Lendager, P. Dehnhardt, T. Eilersen / 3:14; 12. / "Del af mit liv" / T. Lendager, P. Dehnhardt / 3:23; 13. / "Isabel" / T. Lendager, P. Dehnhardt, Gert Michelsen, Annette Bork; International Version: No. / Title / Writer(s) / Length; 1. / "Yes or No" / T. Lendager, P. Dehnhardt / 3:40; 2. / "Every Little Move" / T. Lendager, P. Dehnhardt / 3:29; 3. / "Forever Together" / T. Lendager, P. Dehnhardt, A. Eyers / 3:34; 4. / "The First One to Know" / T. Lendager, P. Dehnhardt, C. Paulsen / 3:17; 5. / "Fire" / T. Lendager, P. Dehnhardt / 3:32; 6. / "Sunshine Angel" / T. Lendager, P. Dehnhardt / 3:30; 7. / "Amore Mi" / / 4:04; 8. / "Bad Boyz" / T. Lendager, P. Dehnhardt / 4:03; 9. / "Rain Until September" / T. Lendager, P. Dehnhardt, T. Eilersen / 3:14; 10. / "Part of My Life" / T. Lendager, P. Dehnhardt / 3:23; 11. / "Wish I Could Give You Up" / T. Lendager, P. Dehnhardt / 4:00; 12. / "If I Could" / / 4:20; 13. / "Baby, Now That I've Found You" / MacLeod, MacCauley / 3:23; 14. / "Sha-La-La-La-La (Chief 1 Remix)" (Bonus track) / T. Lendager, P. Dehnhardt / 4:03; 15. / "Every Little Move (Dance Mix)" (Bonus track) / T. Lendager, P. Dehnhardt / 3:26; Total length: / / / 55:03
"—" denotes a recording that did not chart or was not released in that territory.

=== Compilation albums ===
List of studio albums with selected chart positions and track lists
Title	Album details	Peak chart positions	Track list
Title	Album details	DNK	Track list
Greatest Hits	Released: 1972; April 1, 1994; Format: LP, CD; Label: Philips	—	Side A: No. / Title / Writer(s) / Length; 1. / "Fire" / Torben Lendager, Poul Dehnhardt; 2. / "Forever Together" / T. Lendager, P. Dehnhardt; 3. / "Strip Tease" / T. Lendager, P. Dehnhardt; 4. / "Dabadio-Dabadie" / Daniel Vangarde, Jean Kluger, Franck Gérald, Nelly Byl; 5. / "Wish I Could Give You Up" / T. Lendager, P. Dehnhardt; 6. / "Let's Go, Let's Go, Let's Rock 'N' Roll" / T. Lendager, P. Dehnhardt; 7. / "Rosie" / T. Lendager, P. Dehnhardt; Side B: No. / Title / Writer(s) / Length; 1. / "Baby Love" / T. Lendager, P. Dehnhardt; 2. / "Little Kitty" / T. Lendager, P. Dehnhardt; 3. / "Sha-La-La-La-La" / T. Lendager, P. Dehnhardt; 4. / "Do the Yo Yo" / T. Lendager, P. Dehnhardt; 5. / "Sunshine" / T. Lendager, P. Dehnhardt; 6. / "Marry Me" / T. Lendager; 7. / "Rock 'N' Roll Band" / T. Lendager, P. Dehnhardt; CD: No. / Title / Writer(s) / Length; 1. / "Fire" / T. Lendager, P. Dehnhardt; 2. / "Forever Together" / T. Lendager, P. Dehnhardt; 3. / "Strip Tease" / T. Lendager, P. Dehnhardt; 4. / "Dabadio-Dabadie" / D. Vangarde, J. Kluger, F. Gérald, N. Byl; 5. / "Wish I Could Give You Up" / T. Lendager, P. Dehnhardt; 6. / "Let's Go, Let's Go, Let's Rock 'N' Roll" / T. Lendager, P. Dehnhardt; 7. / "Rosie" / T. Lendager, P. Dehnhardt; 8. / "Baby Love" / T. Lendager, P. Dehnhardt; 9. / "Little Kitty" / T. Lendager, P. Dehnhardt; 10. / "Sha-La-La-La-La" / T. Lendager, P. Dehnhardt; 11. / "Do the Yo Yo" / T. Lendager, P. Dehnhardt; 12. / "Sunshine" / T. Lendager, P. Dehnhardt; 13. / "Marry Me" / T. Lendager; 14. / "Rock 'N' Roll Band" / T. Lendager, P. Dehnhardt
Sha-La-La-La-La: Greatest Hits	Released: February 14, 2000; Format: CD; Label: Universal Music	—	Disc 1: No. / Title / Length; 1. / "Forever Together" / 3:31; 2. / "Sha-La-La-La-La" / 3:01; 3. / "Dabadio-Dabadie" / 2:17; 4. / "Fire" / 3:08; 5. / "Funky Night" / 2:50; 6. / "Sundown" / 4:11; 7. / "Baby Love" / 3:30; 8. / "Strip Tease" / 2:58; 9. / "Do the Yo-Yo" / 2:49; 10. / "Raggy Lady" / 3:23; 11. / "Little Kitty" / 2:16; 12. / "Rosie" / 2:33; 13. / "My Beautiful You" / 2:38; 14. / "Cinderella" / 3:13; 15. / "Sunshine" / 3:00; 16. / "(We're Just A) Rock 'N' Roll Band" / 3:27; 17. / "Wish I Could Give You Up" / 3:31; 18. / "Dance On (Disco Darling)" / 4:06; 19. / "Let's Go, Let's Go, Let's Rock 'N' Roll" / 2:31; 20. / "Aeroplane Song" / 3:12; 21. / "Marry Me" / 3:27; 22. / "Looky Looky" / 2:37; 23. / "Face the Reality" / 3:13; Total length: / / 71:22; Disc 2: No. / Title / Length; 1. / "Sha-La-La-La-La" (Pop 2000 mix); 2. / "Amore Mi"; 3. / "Little Kitty" (Big 8 mix); 4. / "Do the Ya Ya" (Shafty mix); 5. / "If I Could"; 6. / "Strip Tease" (Trance mix); 7. / "Saving My Kisses for Saturday"; 8. / "This Boys, This Girls" (GM mix); 9. / "Sunny Honey Days in Terreno" (Old Days mix); 10. / "Bang-Shang-A-Lang"; 11. / "Face the Reality" (Ambient mix); 12. / "Sha-La-La-La-La" (W2000 Extended Mix); 13. / "Babies Ablaze"; 14. / "I Wanna Go Back"; 15. / "Fire"; 16. / "Let Me Be Loved"; 17. / "En Kort Summer"; 18. / "Vi Holder Fest"; 19. / "Sha-La-La-La-La" (Pasta mix)
Alle Tiders: Walkers Forever	Released: May 19, 2006; Format: CD; Label: Universal Music	—	Tracks: No. / Title / Length; 1. / "Forever Together" / 3:35; 2. / "Sha-La-La-La-La" / 3:04; 3. / "Little Kitty" / 2:18; 4. / "Strip Tease" / 3:01; 5. / "Dabadio-Dabadie" / 2:19; 6. / "Fire" / 3:11; 7. / "Baby Love" / 3:32; 8. / "Do the Yo-Yo" / 2:52; 9. / "Rosie" / 2:36; 10. / "My Beautiful You" / 2:41; 11. / "Cinderella" / 3:17; 12. / "Sunshine" / 3:03; 13. / "Wish I Could Give You Up" / 3:33; 14. / "Dance On (Disco Darling)" / 4:08; 15. / "Aeroplane Song" / 3:14; 16. / "Let's Go, Let's Go, Let's Rock 'N' Roll" / 2:34; 17. / "Marry Me" / 3:29; 18. / "(We're Just A) Rock 'N' Roll Band" / 3:29; 19. / "Funky Night" / 2:53; 20. / "Sundown" / 4:14; 21. / "Raggy Lady" / 3:26; 22. / "Looky Looky" / 2:40; 23. / "Little Kitty" / 2:34; 24. / "Sha-La-La-La-La" / 4:04; Total length: / / 75:47
Dejlige Danske...	Released: April 28, 2008; Format: CD; Label: Universal Music	—	Disc 1: No. / Title / Length; 1. / "Forever Together" / 3:35; 2. / "Sha-La-La-La-La" / 3:04; 3. / "Little Kitty" / 2:18; 4. / "Strip Tease" / 3:01; 5. / "Dabadio-Dabadie" / 2:19; 6. / "Fire" / 3:11; 7. / "I Wanna Boogie" / 5:01; 8. / "Baby Love" / 3:32; 9. / "Do the Yo-Yo" / 2:52; 10. / "Rosie" / 2:36; 11. / "Amore Mi" / 4:06; 12. / "Face the Reality" / 3:16; 13. / "My Beautiful You" / 2:41; 14. / "Cinderella" / 3:17; 15. / "Wish I Could Give You Up" / 3:33; 16. / "Dance On (Disco Darling)" / 4:09; 17. / "Aeroplane Song" / 3:14; 18. / "If I Could" / 4:22; Total length: / / 1:00:07; Disc 2: No. / Title / Length; 1. / "Sunshine" / 3:03; 2. / "Raggy Lady" / 3:26; 3. / "Let's Go, Let's Go, Let's Rock 'N' Roll" / 2:34; 4. / "Marry Me" / 3:29; 5. / "(We're Just A) Rock 'N' Roll Band" / 3:30; 6. / "Funky Night" / 2:53; 7. / "Sundown" / 4:14; 8. / "Looky Looky" / 2:40; 9. / "Jungle Boogie" / 3:08; 10. / "Face the Reality" (Ambient Mix) / 4:24; 11. / "Saving My Kisses for Saturday" / 3:26; 12. / "This Boy This Girl" (GM Mix) / 3:47; 13. / "Sunny Honey Days in Torreno" (Old Days Mix) / 3:47; 14. / "Little Kitty" (Big 8 Mix) / 2:34; 15. / "Do the Yo-Yo" (Shaft Mix) / 3:19; 16. / "Sha-La-La-La-La" (Pasta Mix) / 5:13; Total length: / / 55:07
40 Års Jubilæumsbox	Released: June 22, 2009; Format: CD; Label: Universal Music	—	Disc 1: No. / Title / Writer(s) / Length; 1. / "Dabadio-Dabadie" / Daniel Vangarde, Jean Kluger, Franck Gérald, Nelly Byl / 2:19; 2. / "(We're Just A) Rock 'N' Roll Band" / Torben Lendager, Poul Dehnhardt / 3:30; 3. / "Raggy Lady" / T. Lendager, P. Dehnhardt / 3:26; 4. / "Springtime" / T. Lendager, P. Dehnhardt / 3:27; 5. / "Sunny Honey Days in Terreno" / T. Lendager, P. Dehnhardt / 3:24; 6. / "Rosie" / T. Lendager, P. Dehnhardt / 2:36; 7. / "Sunshine" / T. Lendager, P. Dehnhardt / 3:03; 8. / "Set Me Free" / Dennis Dehnhardt, P. Dehnhardt / 3:31; 9. / "For You, Heaven" / T. Lendager, P. Dehnhardt / 4:04; 10. / "Take Me Back San Francisco" / T. Lendager, P. Dehnhardt / 3:13; 11. / "Country Sideway" / T. Lendager, P. Dehnhardt / 1:32; 12. / "Marry Me" / T. Lendager, P. Dehnhardt / 3:29; 13. / "Bang-Shang-A-Lang" / Jeff Barry / 2:20; 14. / "Suddenly" (Version 2) / Barry Gibb, Maurice Gibb, Robin Gibb / 2:40; 15. / "Looky Looky" / Giorgio Moroder / 2:40; 16. / "Baby, Won't You Leave Me Alone" / Kenny Beveridge, L. Wright / 2:31; 17. / "Suddenly" (Version 1) / B. Gibb, M. Gibb, R. Gibb / 2:46; 18. / "Marry Me" / T. Lendager / 2:16; 19. / "For You Heaven" / T. Lendager, P. Dehnhardt / 2:18; 20. / "To Love Somebody" / B. Gibb, M. Gibb, R. Gibb / 2:44; 21. / "You Ain't Going Nowhere" / / 2:44; 22. / "Let it Be Me" / Gilbert Bécaud, Mann Curtis, Pierre Delanoë / 3:13; Disc 2: No. / Title / Length; 1. / "Face the Reality" (Instrumental) / 3:12; 2. / "Let's Go, Let's Go, Let's Rock 'N' Roll" / 2:34; 3. / "I'm Your Rock 'N' Roller" / 3:20; 4. / "California Groupie" / 3:49; 5. / "Little Kitty" / 2:18; 6. / "Dearest Irene" / 3:08; 7. / "I Do the Show Just for You" / 3:36; 8. / "Where Did You Go" / 2:50; 9. / "Face the Reality" / 3:13; 10. / "The Nightmare" / 6:32; 11. / "Green Grass and Sunshine" / 2:41; 12. / "Sha-La-La-La-La" / 2:54; 13. / "High School Queen" / 2:56; 14. / "Fire" / 3:11; 15. / "All Right All Night" / 3:03; 16. / "Do the Yo-Yo" / 2:52; 17. / "My Beautiful You" / 2:41; 18. / "Strip Tease" / 3:01; 19. / "This Boy This Girl" / 3:44; 20. / "Wish I Could Give You Up" / 3:33; 21. / "Wild Party" / 3:38; Disc 3: No. / Title / Length; 1. / "Forever Together" / 3:35; 2. / "Baby Love" / 3:32; 3. / "Saving My Kisses for Saturday" / 3:23; 4. / "Turn Around and Love Me" / 3:06; 5. / "Sundown" / 4:14; 6. / "Starchaser" / 3:20; 7. / "Dance On (Disco Darling)" / 4:09; 8. / "Fight On" / 4:25; 9. / "Let's Get it Together" / 4:42; 10. / "Who is Right, Who is Wrong" / 3:58; 11. / "Aeroplane Song" / 3:14; 12. / "Cinderella" / 3:17; 13. / "Gipsy Woman" / 3:31; 14. / "I Wanna Boogie" / 5:01; 15. / "Funky Night" / 2:53; 16. / "Jungle Boogie" / 3:08; 17. / "Walkers Up-To-Date-Megamix" / 4:51; 18. / "Little Kitty Up-To-Date-Mix" / 3:56; 19. / "Når vi vinder guld" / 3:25; 20. / "Amore Mi" / 4:03; 21. / "If I Could" / 4:40; Disc 4: No. / Title / Length; 1. / "I Do the Show Just for You"; 2. / "Strip Tease"; 3. / "Little Kitty"; 4. / "Sha-La-La-La-La"; 5. / "Face the Reality"
"—" denotes a recording that did not chart or was not released in that territory.

=== Singles ===
List of singles as main artist, with selected chart positions, showing year released, album name and B-sides
Title	Year	Peak chart positions	Album	B-sides
Title	Year	DNK	Album	B-sides
"Bang-Shang-A-Lang"	1970	—	Sha-La-La-La-La: Greatest Hits	"Suddenly"
"Looky Looky"	1970	—	Sha-La-La-La-La: Greatest Hits	"Baby, Won't You Leave Me Alone"
"Marry Me"	1971	2	Walkers	"For You, Heaven"
"Dabadio-Dabadie"	1972	1	Walkers	"Set Me Free"
"Rosie"	1972	6	Walkers	"Springtime"
"Sunshine"	1972	5	Walkers	"Raggy Lady"
"(We're Just A) Rock 'N' Roll Band"	1973	7	Walkers	"Sunny Honey Days in Terreno"
"Sha-La-La-La-La"	1973	2	Greatest Hits	"High School Queen"
"Fire",	1973	1	Greatest Hits	"All Right All Night"
"Do the Yo-Yo"	1974	1	A Show Just for You	"My Beautiful You"
"Let's Go, Let's Go, Let's Rock 'N' Roll"	1974	4	A Show Just for You	"California Groupie"
"Little Kitty"	1974	2	A Show Just for You	"Face the Reality"
"Strip Tease"	1974	1	Greatest Hits	"This Boy This Girl"
"I Do the Show Just for You"	1974	—	A Show for You	—
"Wish I Could Give You Up"	1975	8	Greatest Hits	"Wild Party"
"Forever Together"	1975	1	Forever Together	"Starchaser"
"Baby Love"	1975	9	Forever Together	"Who is Right, Who is Wrong
"Cinderella"	1976	—	Sha-La-La-La-La: Greatest Hits	"Gipsy Woman"
"Dance On (Disco Darling)"	1977	—	Forever Together	"Aeroplane Song"
"I Wanna Boogie"	1977	—	Dejlige Danske...	—
"Up to Date"	1990	—	Non-album single	—
"Baby, Now That I've Found You"	2001	—	Reinstalled	"The First One to Know"
"—" denotes a recording that did not chart or was not released in that territory.
