= Nicholas Synge =

Irish Anglican priest (died 1771)

Nicholas Synge was an 18th-century Irish Anglican priest.

Synge was educated at Trinity College, Dublin. He was Rector of Headford and Prebendary of Kilbeg from 1720 until 1731 and Archdeacon of Tuam from 1731 until 1743. He was appointed Prebendary of Malahide in St Patrick's Cathedral, Dublin in 1737 and resigned in 1743 to become Archdeacon of Dublin. In 1745 he became Bishop of Killaloe and from 1752 Bishop of Killaloe and Kilfenora.

He died on 19 January 1771: his brother was also a bishop.
