= Nakatomi (group) =

Dutch happy hardcore act

- Origin: Netherlands
- Genres: Eurodance, happy hardcore
- Years active: 1995-1996
- Past members: DJ Delmundo; DJ Danski

Nakatomi was a Dutch happy hardcore act of the mid 1990s, formed by DJs/producers Wessel van Diepen (as DJ Delmundo) and Dennis van Driesschen (as DJ Danski).

Nakatomi began at the end of 1995 with the release of "Free", which spent 6 weeks in the Dutch Top 40, peaking at number 17. The next single, "Children of the Night", was released May 1996, spending 11 weeks in the Dutch charts, peaking at number 2. "Children of the Night" also charted in the UK Singles Chart at number 47 in 1998 with a re-release peaking at number 31 in 2002. The final single, "Sing", was released toward the end of 1996, charting at number 5 in the Netherlands.

In June 2019, "Children of the Night" was chosen as Gateshead F.C.'s official walk-out music for the 2019/20 National League North football season.
