= Wessel van Diepen =

Dutch radio host & music producer

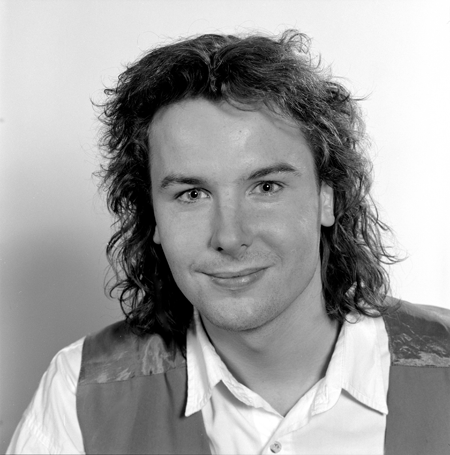
- Wessel van Diepen (1989)

Background information
- Also known as: DJ Delmundo
- Born: Wessel Dietrich van Diepen; Delft, South Holland, Netherlands
- Genres: Eurodance
- Occupations: Music producer, radio host
- Years active: 1989–present

Wessel Dietrich van Diepen is a Dutch radio host, music producer, and former TV presenter. Under the pseudonym DJ Delmundo, he is part of Danski & Delmundo, the production duo behind acts like the Vengaboys and Alice Deejay. With a total of 10 UK top 10 hits including 2 UK number one hits, two Billboard Dance number one hits, a gold album in the US and multi-platinum selling singles worldwide, he is one of the most successful dance-pop music producers in Dutch history. Van Diepen is the station-voice for Radio 538 and FOX Television NL and does movie trailer voiceover work. In spring 2019, Dutch online newspaper Nu.nl declared Vengaboys as the most successful Dutch pop group in history.

== Career ==
Diepen was born in Delft, South Holland, At age 15, van Diepen started a pirate radio station called "Radio Stad Delft". The station was taken down by the police numerous times. When he was 17 years old, during a holiday in Wichita, Kansas, U.S., he met a DJ at KKRD who gave van Diepen the opportunity to fill in for him.

In 1986, van Diepen was noticed by 3FM DJ Rob Stenders in the Netherlands and became a DJ at the VARA, which also broadcasts via national radio 3FM.

As a fresh voice in Dutch radio, van Diepen was recruited by popular broadcasting organization Veronica for radio and TV programs. This included the Europe-wide broadcast pop music TV show Countdown, broadcast on Sky Channel and Super Channel, which brought him to international fame.

In the 1990s, television moguls Erik de Zwart and Lex Harding left Veronica and started Radio 538 and van Diepen was asked to join them. From his daily drive-time show he went on to create the radio show "Van Diepen's Dance Department" where DJs such as Tiësto and Oakenfold would spin their vinyl live in the studio. When Dutch music video channel TMF (The Music Factory) was launched in 1995, van Diepen took up a VJ role in a show called Wessels Woelige Wereld (translated: "Wessels Wild World"), which he hosted until 1999.

Van Diepen also started a run of dance music productions in the 1990s. Together with Peran van Dijk and later Dennis van Den Driesschen ('Danski'), he produced acts such as L.A. Style, known for "James Brown Is Dead" (with van Diepen doing the trademark megaphone catchphrase). "James Brown Is Dead" was their first song to hit the Billboard Hot 100. They also found success with Nakatomi, Alice Deejay and Vengaboys. The Vengaboys alone sold over 15 million singles and 4.5 million albums. The group went platinum in 73 countries and performed in more than 130 countries.

The Vengaboys split in 2000, but van Diepen co-wrote and produced their comeback release "Rocket to Uranus" in 2010. In 2013, Protocol Recordings released the EDM track "WTF!?" which was also co-written by van Diepen and produced by Nicky Romero and Peran van Dijk.

Van Diepen resigned as a radio presenter in 2006 to focus more on artist development and music production, but he returned to Radio 538 in 2013 with Global Dance Chart, a weekly beat-mixed chart-show with the 40 biggest dance hits worldwide. The show was officially opened by Martin Garrix smashing a bottle of champagne on van Diepen's head.
