= Thomas Barton (Bordeaux merchant) =

Irish-born wine merchant

Thomas Barton (1695–1780) was an Irish-born merchant who established himself in the wine trade at Bordeaux and became a spokesman for the “British factory”, as the city’s anglophone négociants were known. He amassed a considerable fortune, much of which he invested in landed estate in Ireland, and founded the family that for several generations controlled the Barton & Guestier wine brand and continues to own two of the grand cru vineyards of the Médoc.

== Birth and marriage ==
Born on 21 December 1695, he was a son of William and Elizabeth (née Dickson) Barton of Curraghmore in County Fermanagh, and a male line descendant of Protestants from Norwich who had settled in Ulster early in the same century. He was, by his own account, “bred up a merchant” by his mother’s brothers at Ballyshannon, County Donegal, and in 1722 he reinforced his relationship with another mercantile family of that port by marrying his mother’s cousin Margaret Delap who, aged forty-one, was some fourteen years his senior.

== Settlement and early success in France ==
Soon after his marriage he went to France and, after briefly working as a factor at Marseille and then at Montpellier, he settled at Bordeaux in 1725. There he was initially an exporter of brandy, in which his wife's uncle had traded, (Note: This uncle, Gilbert Delap, was importing brandy into Ballyshannon in the 1680s: Calendar of Treasury Papers, June-August 1689 (entries dated 28 June and 4 July). According to Théophile Malvezin (Histoire du Commerce de Bordeaux depuis les origines jusqu'à nos jours, A. Bellier et Cie, Bordeaux, 1892, Vol. 3, p. 148) Barton's business at Bordeaux had been "founded in 1704"; if this is correct, he presumably continued an operation established by a family member.) and probably an importer of salt-beef, (Note: Barton's uncle Thomas Dickson was engaged in curing and salting at Ballyshannon when Barton was "bred up a merchant" by him: Public Record Office of Northern Ireland, D3000/52/1. By the 1740s vessels chartered by Barton were, after discharging their cargo of claret at Cork and Limerick, returning to Bordeaux with salt-beef: Anthony Barton and Claude Petit-Castelli, La Saga des Barton, Editions Manya, Levallois, 1991, p. 23.) cereals and butter. Ireland consumed the former and supplied the latter and was already a significant market for French wine - of which, by the 1740s, it was buying more than four times the quantity shipped to England.

Barton's arrival in Bordeaux followed a period of rapid expansion in the region's vineyards (and first establishment of the appellation boundaries), and he soon began to trade in local wines, notably those of the Médoc. These he bought en primeur, matured, and regularly blended with wines he sourced from Spain to create a product that in body and colour had particular appeal for the Irish and English markets. He was a major customer for both medium and high end wines (including Lafite, of which he was the dominant buyer by the late 1740s, and Margaux) and within two decades had become the largest shipper of the region's claret.

His local standing was recognised as early as 1732 when he was recommended to the Duke of Newcastle (then in charge of Britain's foreign affairs) for appointment as British Consul at Bordeaux. In 1744 Sir James Caldwell, who lodged with him in the city's Quartier des Chartrons for three months, thought him worth £60,000. (Note: Notwithstanding Caldwell's dismissal of Barton’s family as "bigoted Presbyterians", he gladly relied on Thomas as a source of funds and commercial introductions: J. B. Cunningham, Mysterious Boa Island, Belleek, 1992, p. 9. His younger brother Henry Caldwell was employed by Barton at Bordeaux from 1752 (but left to join the army at the outbreak of the Seven Years' War, later becoming Receiver-General of Lower Canada): Toby Barnard, A New Anatomy of Ireland, The Irish Protestants 1649-1770, Yale University Press, 2004 (first paperback edition), pp. 263, 439.)

It has been suggested that his early ventures included shipments whereby Irish wool (which could not lawfully be exported otherwise than to England) was covertly exchanged for French brandy and claret (which were dutiable in Ireland). While there is no evidence clearly implicating him in this activity, he may have been party to subterfuge when conventional trade patterns were disrupted during wartime.

In April 1746, during the War of the Austrian Succession, he bought the ship Elizabeth of Bordeaux from his brother-in-law James Boyd (Note: By June 1737 Barton had prospered sufficiently that he was able to provide his sister Everina with a dowry of 20,000 livres on her marriage to Boyd: Barton and Petit-Castelli, p. 17.) and on the same day resold her for the same price to one Brown, an Irishman based at Trondheim in Norway. In the following year the vessel, now plying under the name De Jumfro Sarah, was seized by a privateer in the Bay of Biscay when bound from Dublin with a cargo of wheat and butter purportedly for delivery to Lisbon. The consignor was the Dublin merchant William Delap, brother of Barton's wife, and subsequent Admiralty Court proceedings determined that the vessel was most probably destined for Bordeaux, for which she had no clearance, and her cargo was condemned as contraband.

William Delap was an important contributor to the rapid growth of his brother-in-law's business, both by sourcing Irish produce for him and by energetic development of an extensive distribution network for his wines in Ireland. In 1743 Barton took William's son, Samuel Delap, into his business, (Note: Other Delap relatives also spent time with the firm. The 1775 will of Francis Delap, sometime Provost Marshal of Jamaica, mentioned "Thomas Barton Esquire Merchant in Bordeaux my good old Master and Uncle": TNA, PROB11/1014/193.) and six years later he made Samuel a partner with a one-third interest in the concern.

In the late 1740s Barton's application for permission to bring timber into Bordeaux from Philadelphia for making barrel staves (Note: The Baltic was then the principal source for Bordeaux's staves. In August 1746 De Jumfro Sarah (the vessel Barton had bought and sold earlier that year) carried timber from Trondheim to Bordeaux.) probably indicates he already had business with New England, and in the 1750s the French West Indies were a target for his trade.

The droit d'aubaine (whereby ownership of a foreigner's estate in France automatically became the property of the French monarch on the foreigner's death) deterred Barton from buying real estate in France, but in 1747 he took a lease of the wine-producing Château le Boscq in the village of St Corbian and commune of St Estèphe - probably thereby becoming the first Bordeaux négociant to be both a grower and a shipper.

== Purchase of Irish estates ==
In March 1751, electing to enlarge his Irish estate (he had inherited his father’s Curraghmore property and, in 1735, had bought the late Sir Henry Caldwell’s house at Ballyshannon), he purchased the extensive holdings of the insolvent Everard family in and around the town of Fethard, County Tipperary, for £30,500 (Note: The 1751 Fethard purchase excluded the mansion and demesne lands of Grove but these were acquired by Barton in 1767 and became the principal residence of his wife and son: Thomas Laffan, “Fethard, Co. Tipperary. Its Charters and Corporation Records, with some notice of the Fethard Everards”, Journal of the Royal Society of Antiquaries of Ireland, Fifth Series, Vol. 36, No. 2 (1906), p.145.) and somewhat later he acquired several properties in County Fermanagh from Sir James Caldwell and spent £19,500 buying the Kilmore estate of 15,500 acres on the north-east side of Lough Erne.

== During and after the Seven Years' War ==
For some time after outbreak of the Seven Years' War in 1756, and probably from an earlier date, he confined himself to Ireland (Note: He was based at Dublin in March 1755 and was said to have “retired” to his Fethard property prior to the outbreak of war: Lease and Release dated 25/26 March 1755 Register of Deeds, Dublin, number 172.559.118153; Malvezin, Vol. 3, p. 69.) and entrusted day-to-day control of his affairs in France to Samuel Delap. Delap now held an equal half-share in their firm which traded under the style “Barton & Delap”.

An Irish Revenue memorandum of 1756 observed that the firm “have a house settled at Bordeaux & have lands & vineyards in France & are to all intents and purposes French”. Barton, now commonly known in Irish circles as “French Tom”, was anxious to counter suspicion that he favoured enemy interests and in October 1756 executed a declaration explaining it was at the suggestion of London wine merchants that he had leased vineyards in France. The declaration was forwarded to Henry Fox by Sir Robert Wilmot under cover of an assurance that Barton was “strongly recommended” by the Duke of Devonshire (then Lord Lieutenant of Ireland and about to become prime minister).

The war disrupted shipping routes and commercial relationships, and this, together with failure of the Bordeaux region’s 1756 vintage and the local parliament’s prohibition on blending local wine with imports, presented Barton & Delap with a succession of challenges. Their operations were temporarily exiled to Angoulême, but by late 1762 peace negotiations between Britain and France were sufficiently advanced for the firm to return to Bordeaux, the Duke of Bedford (Devonshire’s successor as Lord Lieutenant in Ireland) reportedly interceding on their behalf.

In 1764 Barton was the spokesman for the “British factory”, the group of anglophone (principally Irish) négociants at Bordeaux, protesting against increased penalties for blending. He argued that blending was crucial to the foreign market for Bordeaux wines which, if not “cut” with local knowledge and skill, would be blended elsewhere to standards undermining their reputation for excellence. He was then spoken of as the “most considerable” among the factory’s members and equal in substance to Pierre-Paul Nairac, the shipowner and slave-trader reckoned Bordeaux’s richest resident.

In the same year he terminated his association with Samuel Delap. (Note: Delap subsequently prospered in the Bordeaux trade and died in 1776: Hibernian Chronicle, 1 April 1776, p. 3. His business was continued by his son John Hans Delap who acted as an agent for the Continental Congress during the early phase of the American War of Independence: L. M. Cullen, “The Irish Merchant Communities of Bordeaux, La Rochelle and Cognac in the Eighteenth Century” in Négoce et Industrie en France et en Irelande aux XVIII et XIX Siècles (ed. Butel and Cullen), Paris, 1980, p. 55.)

== Family affairs ==
Cessation of the partnership with Delap was Barton’s response to his own son William’s constant complaint that the association diluted his prospective patrimony. Born nine months after his parents’ marriage and their only child, William had been made a partner in his father’s business when aged twenty. Subsequently judging the young man extravagant and foolish, Thomas terminated his involvement in the Bordeaux operation in 1749, sending him back to Dublin to work with William Delap in servicing the Irish market for wine. Having diluted his son’s share in the business when taking Samuel Delap into partnership, Barton eliminated that share altogether in 1756.

Relations between father and son deteriorated when signature of the latter’s marriage settlement was withheld pending agreement on his future interest in the family firm, and dispute over this issue led to litigation between the pair that reached the Irish House of Lords in 1765.

In 1768 Thomas took a nephew, John Barton, into partnership. Another nephew, Walter Johnston, had previously served as Thomas’s apprentice and these two were living with him at his house in the Chartrons (Note: They were presumably among the seven young men who, wrote Thomas Barton, were “occupying my house and my table” on 24 November 1771: Barton and Petit-Castelli, p. 20.) when, in 1771, he made a will under which they were named as two of his three executors.

The 1768 partnership was terminated in early 1772, on the basis that John Barton would collect its dues and settle its liabilities while at the same time carrying on new business for his own account, paying Thomas half the net profit of the liquidation plus interest on 250,000 French livres advanced by Thomas as working capital for the new business, in which Johnston was also engaged. Mismanagement resulted in confusion between the separate accounts and in default in making the payments due to Thomas who, in 1775, struck from his will the legacies and appointments in favour of the nephews, accusing John (“formerly and unluckily my partner”) of behaving ungratefully and of intending to defraud his descendants of their rights.

Relations between Thomas and his son had remained fraught and, when visiting Ireland in 1769, Thomas elected to stay on his property in County Fermanagh rather than at his Fethard estate where William had presided for more than a decade. While at Curraghmore his personal safety was threatened due to the treatment allegedly received by his local tenants, and later, when famine beset the county, he instructed his agent to abate their rents.

== Final years ==
As the 1770s proceeded, he was increasingly afflicted with gout and spent much of his time on his estate at St Corbian. His wife, who lived separately from him for most of their marriage but to whom he sent regular and affectionate letters, died in Ireland in 1775. Thomas himself died at Bordeaux on 18 October 1780. Reporting his death, a Dublin newspaper paid tribute to “his amiable manner and character and conduct disciplined by the uniform practice of the most exalted virtues”.

His fortune at death was estimated, albeit by his estranged nephew John Barton, as five million livres, and he had recently completed purchase of the considerable Waterfoot estate at Pettigo, close to his Kilmore property in County Fermanagh.

== Successors ==
Although Thomas died determined that his son should have no claim on his trading-house at Bordeaux, William Barton effectively replaced him in the market there. He took his own son, Hugh, into partnership in 1786 and two years later they “bought every drop” of that year’s Lafite, Latour, Brane-Mouton (renamed Mouton-Rothschild in 1853) and Kirwan wines for upwards of 460,000 livres.

In October 1793, during the Reign of Terror, William died and Hugh was interned at Bordeaux. Two years later Hugh Barton left France, entrusting his affairs there to the care of Daniel Guestier who administered them faithfully and energetically; as soon as the Treaty of Amiens was signed in 1802, Hugh returned to Bordeaux and took Guestier into partnership. The firm of Barton & Guestier remained wholly in the ownership of their families until 1954, when a half-share in the operation was bought by Seagram’s, which acquired full ownership in 1986.

In the 1820s Hugh Barton personally bought Château Langoa and part of the Léoville estate (which became Léoville Barton) in the St Julien area of the Medoc. The two grand cru vineyards on these estates continue in the ownership of his descendants, now in the eighth and ninth generations removed from Thomas Barton.

His other descendants have included:

- Thomas Barton (1757-1820), Irish MP
- Lieutenant-General Charles Barton (1760-1819)
- General Sir Robert Barton (1768-1853)
- Sir Dunbar Plunket Barton (1853-1937), Irish judge
- Robert Childers Barton (1881-1975), Irish nationalist.
