= List of Lebanese wineries =

The following is a list of Lebanese wineries. After centuries of being largely confined to monasteries, Lebanon's winemaking industry has experienced a remarkable surge, growing from just five producers in 1995 to more than 50 today. Lebanese wine is known for its terroir which has a combination of good soil, climate, and geology.

| Winery | Founded | Region | Altitude | Founder | Notes | Reference |
|---|---|---|---|---|---|---|
| Adyar | 2003 | Mount Lebanon (Mar Moussa) | 410 m (1,345 ft 1 1/2 in) - 1,600 m (5,249 ft 4 in) | Maronite Catholic Order | Certified organic wine | |
| Atibaia | 2007 | Batroun District (Smar Jbeil) | 400 m (1,312 ft 4 in) - 600 m (1,968 ft 6 in) | Jean Massoud | Boutique, artisanal winery | |
| Aurora Winery | 2002 | Batroun District | 800 m (2,624 ft 8 in) - 900 m (2,952 ft 9 in) | Boutros Geara | Boutique, artisanal winery | |
| Batroun Mountains | 2003 | Batroun District | 400 m (1,312 ft 4 in) - 1,500 m (4,921 ft 3 in) | Hark Family | | |
| Cave du monastère St. Jean | 1720 | Mount Lebanon (Khenchara) | 1,070 m (3,510 ft 6 in) - 1,200 m (3,937 ft 0 in) | Melkite Greek Catholic Church | One of the oldest wineries in Lebanon | |
| Cave Kouroum | 1998 | Bekaa Valley (Kefraya) | 1,000 m (3,280 ft 10 in) | Sami & Bassim Rahhal | Known for its Syrah-Cabernet Sauvignon blend | |
| Chateau Barka | 2009 | Bekaa Valley | 1450–1700 m | Geagea brothers: Sleiman, Ehsan, Hamdan, Hicham and Rakan | Family-owned winery in the Northern Bekaa Valley, known for wines inspired by Phoenician goddesses. | |
| Château Belle-Vue | 2000 | Mount Lebanon (Bhamdoun) | 950 m (3,116 ft 9 1/2 in) - 1,250 m (4,101 ft 1/2 in) | Jill & Naji Boutros | Family owned, organic | |
| Château Cana | 2001 | Mount Lebanon (Bhamdoun) | 900 m (2,952 ft 9 in) | Fadi & Joanna Gerges | Sobbaghieh, produced solely at this domaine | |
| Château Chbat | 1847 | Mount Lebanon (Aramoun) | 730 m (2,395 ft 0 in) | Anis Chbat | Joseph Spath, first winemaker in Lebanon | |
| Château Héritage | 1888 | Bekaa Valley (Qabb Ilyas) | 1,000 m (3,280 ft 10 in) | Touma Family | | |
| Château Ka | 2005 | Bekaa Valley (Chtaura) | 1,000 m (3,280 ft 10 in) | kassately Chtaura | Premium, award-winning red wines | |
| Château Kefraya | 1951 | Bekaa Valley (Kefraya) | 1,000 m (3,280 ft 10 in) | Michel de Bustros | Known for the Comte de M | |
| Château Khoury | 2002 | Bekaa Valley (Zahle) | 1,300 m (4,265 ft 1 in) | Raymond & Brigitte El Khoury | Family owned | |
| Château Ksara | 1857 | Bekaa Valley | 1,000 m (3,280 ft 10 in) - 1,500 m (4,921 ft 3 in) | Jesuits | | |
| Château Marsyas | 2007 | Bekaa Valley | 990 m (3,248 ft 1/2 in) | Johnny R.Saadé family | Family owned, known for Cabernet Sauvignon, Syrah and Merlot blends | |
| Château Musar | 1930 | Bekaa Valley | 1,000 m (3,280 ft 10 in) | Gaston Hochar | Most renowned Lebanese wine | |
| Château Nabise | 1998 | Mount Lebanon (Rechmaya) | 1,000 m (3,280 ft 10 in) | Nazih Metni | | |
| Château Nakad | 1923 | Bekaa Valley (Jdita) | 1,250 m (4,101 ft 1/2 in) | Joseph Nakad | Known for 2013 Chateau Nakad, ‘Cuvée L’Alouette' | |
| Château Qanafar | 2010 | Bekaa Valley (Baalbeck) | 1,200 m (3,937 ft 0 in) | Eddy Naim | Naked Winemaker of 2022 | |
| Château Trois Collines | 2009 | Bekaa Valley | 1,600 m (5,249 ft 4 in) | Ziad Ammar | Organic wines | |
| Château Rayak | 2015 | Bekaa Valley (Rayak) | 900 m (2,952 ft 9 in) | Elias Maalouf | | |
| Château Wadih | 2018 | Mount Lebanon (Aqoura) | 1,300 m (4,265 ft 1 in) | Peter Abi Unes | Produces blue wine | |
| Clos du Phoenix | 2012 | North Lebanon (Eddé) | 200 m (656 ft 2 in) | Chédid & Anid families | | |
| Château St Thomas | 1995 | Bekaa Valley (Qabb Elias) | 1,000 m (3,280 ft 10 in) | Touma Family | | |
| Coteaux Du Liban | 1999 | Bekaa Valley | 1,100 m (3,608 ft 11 in) | Roland Abou-Khater | | |
| Couvent St. Sauveur | 1711 | Southern Lebanon (Joun) | 406 m (1,332 ft 1/2 in) | Basilian Salvatorian Order | Oldest winery in Lebanon | |
| Domaine de Baal | 1995 | Bekaa Valley (Zahle) | 1,200 m (3,937 ft 0 in) | Sebastien Khoury | Boutique, artisanal winery | |
| Domaine de Rmeich | 2017 | Southern Lebanon (Rmeich) | 570 m (1,870 ft 1 in) | Feghali Family | Boutique, artisanal, family owned | |
| Domaine des Tourelles | 1868 | Bekaa Valley (Chtaura) | 1,050 m (3,444 ft 10 1/2 in) | François-Eugène Brun | Lebanon's first commercial winery, uses 100% solar power | |
| Domaine Wardy | 1997 | Bekaa Valley | 900 m (2,952 ft 9 in) - 1,400 m (4,593 ft 2 in) | Wardy Family | Family-owned winery | |
| Karam Wines | 2002 | Southern Lebanon (Jezzine) | 1,400 m (4,593 ft 2 in) | Captain Habib Karam | First winery in Southern Lebanon | |
| Heya Wines | 2022 | North Lebanon (Kadisha Valley) | 1,500 m (4,921 ft 3 in) | Claudine Lteif & Michelle Chami | Woman-owned winery | |
| Iris Domain | 2013 | Mount Lebanon (Batloun) | 1,000 m (3,280 ft 10 in) - 1,200 m (3,937 ft 0 in) | Sarmad Salibi | Boutique, artisanal winery | |
| IXSIR | 2008 | Batroun District | 1,800 m (5,905 ft 6 in) | Gabriel Rivero | | |
| Latourba | 2006 | Bekaa Valley (Saghbine) | 1,000 m (3,280 ft 10 in) | Elie Chehwane | Produces only monovarietal wine | |
| Les Vignes du Marje | 2018 | Southern Lebanon (Marjayoun) | 860 m (2,821 ft 6 1/2 in) | Carol Khoury | | |
| Massaya | 1990 | Bekaa Valley (Reds & Rosé); Mount Lebanon (Whites) | 1,200 m (3,937 ft 0 in) | Ghosn Family | | |
| Mersel Wine | 1990 | North Lebanon (Maksar Mersel) | 2,400 m (7,874 ft 0 in) | Mersel Family | | |
| Mont d'Almaz | 2006 | North Lebanon (Beit Minzer) | 1,260 m (4,133 ft 10 1/2 in) | Saade family | Malbec wine | |
| Muse du Liban | 2015 | North Lebanon (Ainata) | 1,800 m (5,905 ft 6 in) | Michel Rolland | | |
| Riachi | 1839 | Mount Lebanon (Khenchara) | 1,050 m (3,444 ft 10 1/2 in) | Moussa Riachi | Boutique, artisanal winery | |
| Sept Winery | 2017 | Batroun District | 900 m (2,952 ft 9 in) | Maher Harb | Produces vin du lieu | |
| Terre Joie | 2011 | Bekaa Valley (Kefraya) | 1,325 m (4,347 ft 1 1/2 in) | Joe & Maliha Saade | | |
| Vertical 33 | 2011 | Bekaa Valley (Remtanieh) | 1,050 m (3,444 ft 10 1/2 in) | Eid Azar | Produces monovarietal wines | |
