= General Barton =

General Barton may refer to:

- Charles Barton (British Army officer) (1760–1819), British Army lieutenant general
- Geoffrey Barton (1844–1922), British Army major general
- Raymond O. Barton (1889–1963), U.S. Army major general
- Robert Barton (British Army officer) (1768–1853), British Army general
- Seth Barton (1829–1900), Confederate States Army brigadier general
