= John Averell =

Irish bishop

John Averell was an Irish bishop in the third quarter of the 18th century.

A former Dean of Emly, Averell was Dean of Limerick from 1766 until 1770. He was nominated Bishop of Limerick, Ardfert and Aghadoe on 14 December 1770 and consecrated on 6 January the following year. He died on 14 September 1771.

Church of Ireland titles
Preceded by John Brandreth	Dean of Emly; 1765–1766	Succeeded by James Hawkins
Preceded by Charles Massy	Dean of Limerick; 1766–1770	Succeeded by Maurice Crosbie
Preceded by James Leslie	Bishop of Limerick, Ardfert and Aghadoe; 1770–1771	Succeeded by William Gore
