= Lebanese wine =

Wine making in Lebanon

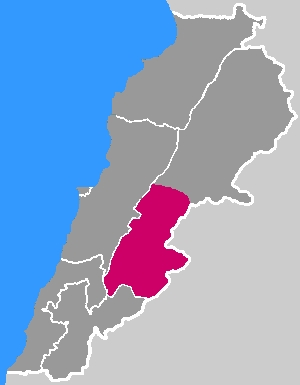
Wine producing areas in Lebanon (red)

Lebanon has a 5,000-year winemaking history and is one of the oldest wine production regions in the world. The prophet Hosea (780–725 BC) is said to have urged his followers to return to God so that "they shall blossom like the vine; their fame shall be like the wine of Lebanon..."

== History ==
=== Antiquity ===
Vitis vinifera probably arrived to Lebanon from the South Caucasus via Mesopotamia or the Black Sea trade routes. The saccharomyces cerevisiae, the yeast strain crucial to winemaking, also originated in Mesopotamia, but a microsatellite-based study identified a distinct cluster in Lebanon.

Wine was cultivated in Lebanon, at least two thousand years before Alexander the Great conquered the Levant in 332 BC.

The Phoenicians were instrumental in spreading wine and viticulture throughout the Mediterranean in ancient times. The wines of Byblos were exported to Greece and Egypt during the Old Kingdom (2686 BC–2134 BC). Byblos wine was highly renowned, with some scholars suggesting that it was crafted from muscat grape varieties.

The wines of Tyre and Sidon were also famous throughout the ancient Mediterranean. Excavations at Tell el-Burak, a Phoenician settlement near Sidon, uncovered a well-preserved wine press dating back to the seventh century BC, along with evidence of nearby vineyards, indicating the site's role in wine production for overseas trade. Robert Ballard found the wrecks of two Phoenician ships from 750 BC, whose cargo of wine was still intact.

As traders of wine, exporting from their Levantine ports, the Phoenicians seem to have protected it from oxidation with a layer of olive oil, followed by a seal of pinewood and resin—this may be the origin of the Greek taste for retsina.

Wine played an important part in Phoenician religion, and the Greek/Roman god Dionysus/Bacchus may have originated in the wine rituals of Canaan. The great temple at Heliopolis (Baalbek) has many depictions of vines and winedrinking, most famously captured by David Roberts in pictures such as "Baalbec - Ruins of the Temple of Bacchus". The Bacchus temple in Baalbek outlines the instrumental role that the Phoenicians played in the development of the Ancient World around the Mediterranean sea.

Phoenician wine is mentioned in the Bible, with Genesis 14:18 recounting how King Melchizedek offered bread and wine ("yayin") to Abraham, and Hosea 14:8 describes the fame of Lebanon's wine as exceptional, saying, "his fame shall be like the wine of Lebanon."

The importance of winemaking in Lebanon continued during the Roman Empire, as evidenced by the stone-carved vines still winding around the columns of the Temple of Bacchus, the Roman god of wine, in the ruins of Baalbek. Some Roman cellars are still in use today, as seen in the cave at Château Ksara, Lebanon's oldest winery. The cellars feature a two-mile-long network of tunnels originally built by the Romans and later revived by the Jesuits, who established the winery in the 19th century.

=== Middle Ages ===
Wine production persisted until the seventh century when Lebanon was conquered by Arabs and came under the control of the Caliphate; however, the large indigenous Christian community was permitted to produce wine primarily for religious purposes, although significant quantities were also made for trade.

In the Middle Ages, the fine wines of Tyre and Sidon were highly prized in Europe and traded by merchants from Venice, who controlled those ports for much of the 13th century.

=== Ottoman period ===
During the Ottoman period, wine production in Lebanon was prohibited for 400 years, with the exception of Lebanese Christians, who were permitted, due to the millet system, to produce wine for religious purposes. This exemption helped preserve viticulture in the region.

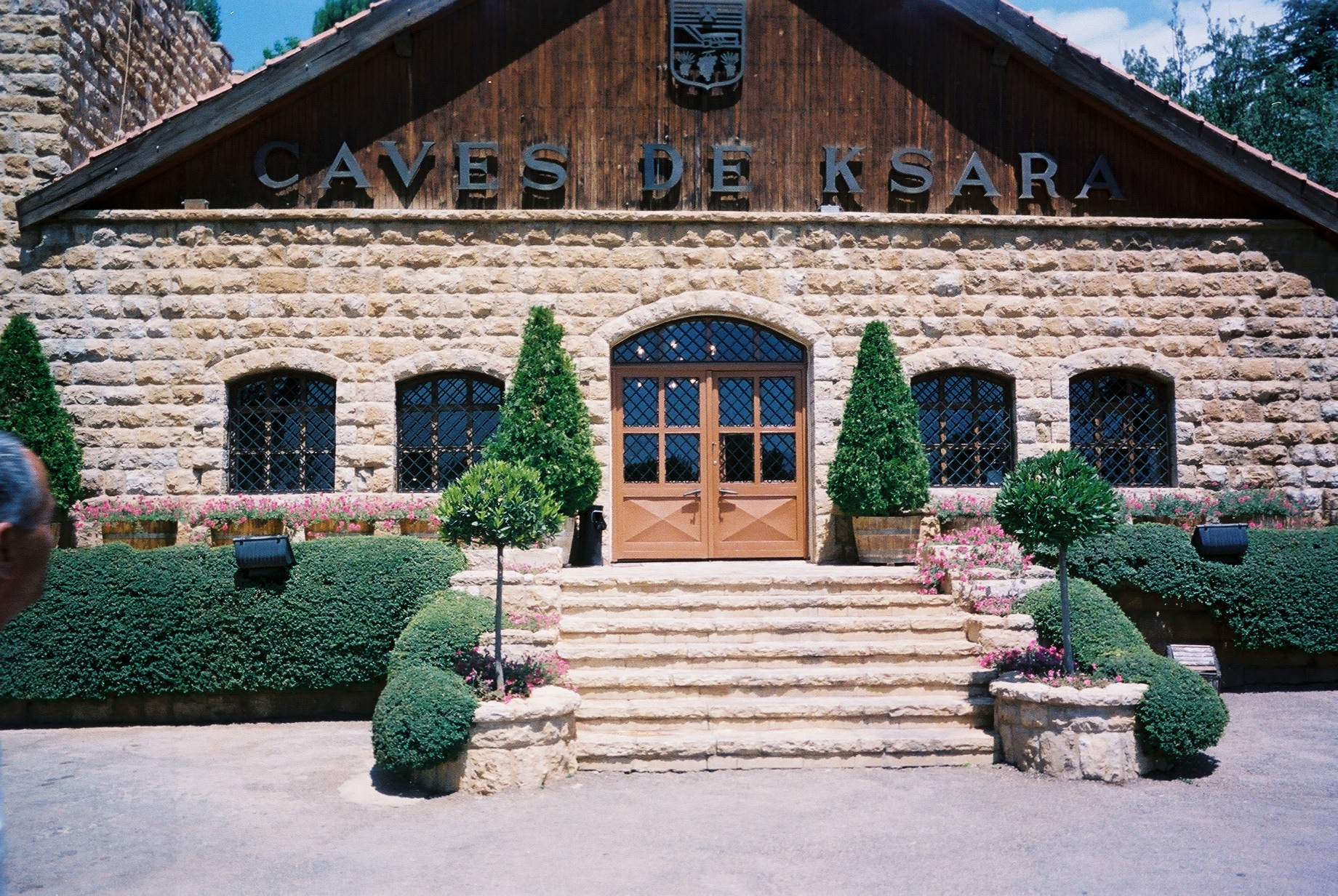
The wine making headquarters of Château Ksara, in Bekaa, Lebanon

Château Chbat was founded in 1847, making it the first modern winemaker in Lebanon, followed by Château Ksara in 1857 when Jesuits planted Cinsaut vines near Zahlé in the central Beqaa Valley. In 1868 a French engineer, Eugène François Brun, founded Domaine des Tourelles. In 1893, Domaine Wardy was founded.

=== French Mandate ===
During the French Mandate (1920–1946), French soldiers and diplomats boosted the local wine market.

The French influence between the World Wars promoted a culture of wine drinking, as did the sophisticated Mediterranean culture of Beirut at that time, sparking unprecedented demand for wine that continues today. During this period, a few wineries were founded, including Domaine Nakad in 1923, Gaston Hochar's Chateau Musar in 1930, and Clos Saint Thomas in 1937.

=== Civil War period ===
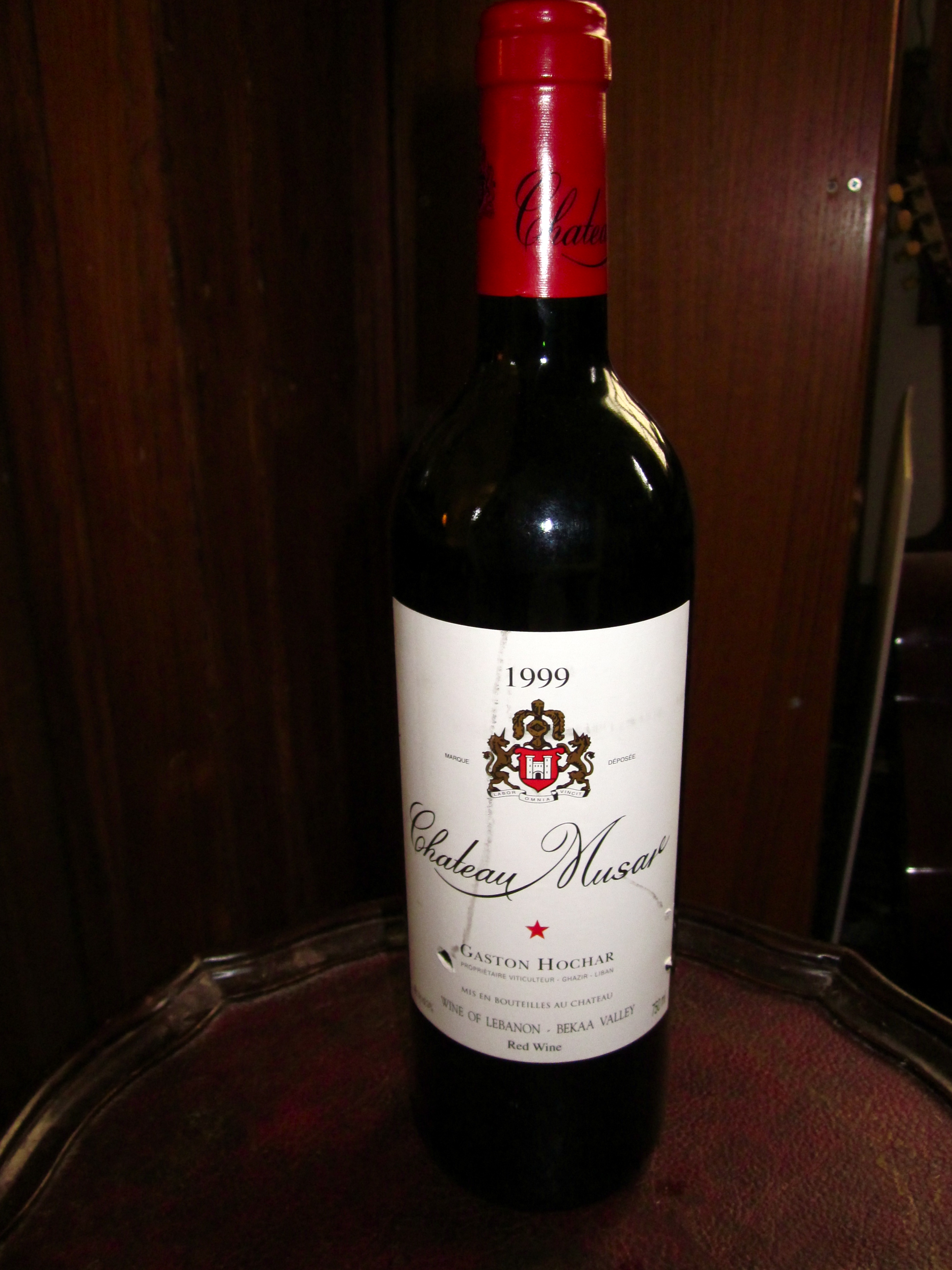
Bottle of Château Musar 1999

In 1976, amid the invasion of 30,000 Syrian troops and the devastation of the Lebanese Civil War (1975–1990), Serge Hochar of Château Musar faced a fractured market and an inability to sell the wines in his cellars, but he seized the opportunity to export them to the UK. After the invasion of Israel in 1982, 80 hectares of Château Musar vineyards in the Bekaa Valley became the frontline between Syrian and Israeli tanks, but Bedouin pickers collected the grapes, and Musar trucks managed to reach the winery. Frenchman Yves Morard of Chateau Kefraya was arrested as a spy during the Israeli invasion, and was only released when he proved to the Israelis that he knew how to make wine. Despite the war, a few wineries, like Château Kefraya, were founded during this period.

=== Present ===
The end of the Lebanese Civil War in the 1990s revitalized viticulture, with new wineries like Domaine Wardy (1997) and Massaya (1998) emerging, alongside significant foreign investment, particularly from France. Peace brought forth a new generation of producers making wines that gained international awards and drew investment.

Lebanon's wineries have withstood numerous crises, including economic challenges, political instability, and multiple wars with Israel in 1982, 1996, 2006, and 2024.

The 2006 conflict, which caused some Lebanese wineries like Ksara to nearly miss the harvest and others like Massaya to suffer collateral damage, disrupted the delivery of winemaking materials and forced producers to risk picking grapes with Israeli planes overhead, until a ceasefire was brokered just as the first Chardonnay grapes reached maturity, allowing producers to harvest. The media coverage of the war translated into surge in demand during the fighting as British buyers in particular bought Lebanese wine as a mark of solidarity.

In 2024, the eastern Bekaa Valley, the sprawling agricultural region that produces much of Lebanon's wine, was one of the areas most severely affected by Israeli strikes. While the Coteaux Du Liban winery itself was spared, its vineyards lay next to heavily targeted towns. Many other winemakers, including Château Rayak, sustained significant damage to wine cellars and the destruction of infrastructure essential for fermenting and chilling grapes. Despite the war, damaged infrastructure, and rising costs from the conflict, Lebanon’s winemakers were able to harvest and produce 15 million bottles in 2024.

== Wine regions and climate ==
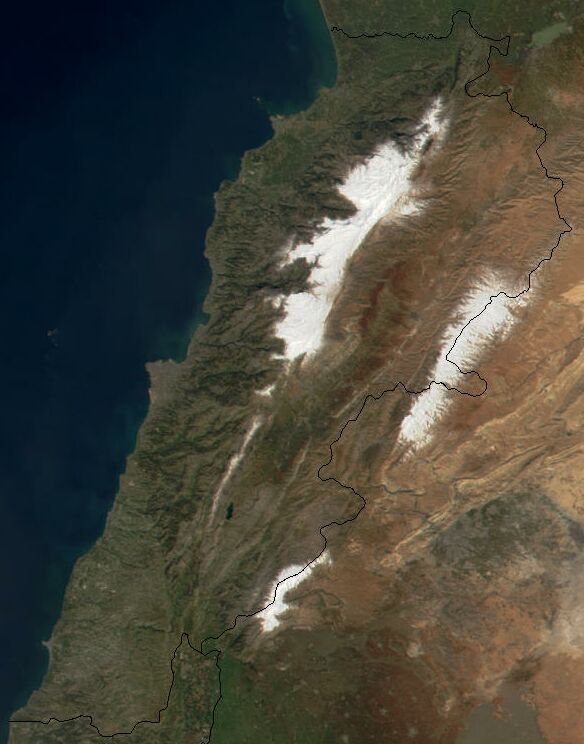
Map of Lebanon

What makes Lebanon's winemaking regions stand out from other countries is the altitude, with grapes grown at the highest elevations in the Northern Hemisphere, ranging from 900 to 2,400 meters. In addition to Lebanon's mountainous region, the country boasts diverse topography, including mountains, valleys, and coastal plains, which create a wide range of microclimates ideal for grape cultivation. This gives the country three distinctive viticultural climates:

- Subtropical Mediterranean on the coast
- Alpine in the mountains
- Continental in the Bekaa Valley

Lebanon's climate closely resembles that of the Rhône.

=== Bekaa Valley ===
Often transcribed as the Bekaa Valley in the wine industry, the Beqaa Valley, particularly the agricultural regions in its eastern areas, accounts for the majority of Lebanon's renowned wine production.

Since Biblical times, the Bekaa Valley—a high plain nestled between two mountain ranges—has been prized for its soil, climate, and vines, supplying wine to the Phoenicians, Persians, and Roman army. The valley's conditions remain ideal for vines today: rich soils, protected slopes and valleys, almost year-round sunshine, high altitude with no summer rainfall, guaranteed harvest start dates, and minimal risk of disease.

=== Other regions ===
While most Lebanese winemaking takes place in the southern and western parts of the expansive Bekaa Valley, other regions include the high-altitude areas of:

- Batroun District
- North Lebanon
- Mount Lebanon
- Southern Lebanon, particularly Jezzine.

== Grape varieties ==
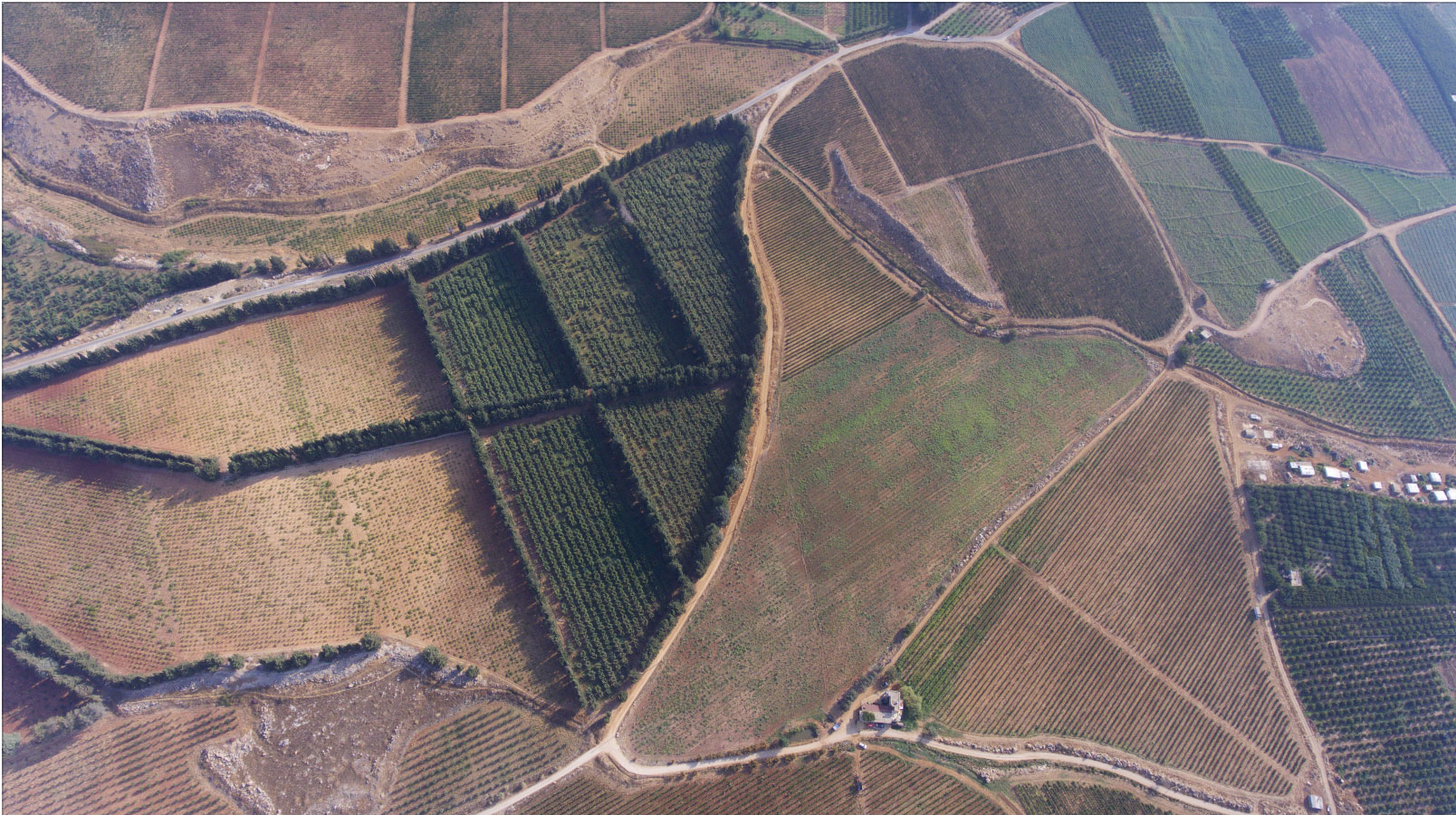
Château Ksara vineyards

Lebanese wine is made from a mix of international and indigenous grape varieties, with Cabernet Sauvignon adding structure and longevity to reds, Merlot contributing smoothness and fruity notes, Syrah enhancing blends with spices and complexity, Chardonnay producing rich and complex whites, and Sauvignon Blanc adding freshness and citrus notes. While the indigenous white varieties Merwah and Obeideh are commonly used, Lebanese winemakers are increasingly focused on rediscovering and experimenting with other lesser-known native grape varieties, such as Tfeifihi, Zeini, Meksassi, Mourad, and Soubbagh. Additionally, a growing number of wineries are adopting organic and biodynamic farming methods. Christian Maronite monks introduced the country's first certified organic wine, labeled Adyar—meaning "monasteries" in Arabic—which has recently caught the attention of connoisseurs with bottles emblazoned with a cross.

=== Red varieties ===
Lebanese red wines, especially those from the Bekaa Valley, are known for their depth, complexity, and aging potential.

Reds feature Rhône and Bordeaux blends, like the common Cabernet-Syrah with a unique spice component and flavors like cumin, sumac, incense, rosewater, carob, kirsch, and banana, as well as notes of dark fruits, spices, tobacco, and leather, with well-structured tannins and balanced acidity. Red varieties also include Cinsault, Carignan, and Syrah. Cinsault, introduced to Lebanon by French Jesuits in the 19th century, with vintner Faouzi Issa of Domaine des Tourelles believing it can become Lebanon's champion, as its ability to fully ripen in Lebanon's year-round sunshine and high altitudes creates a concentrated, complex wine, unlike its underdog status in France.

The indigenous red varieties, Meksassi, Mourad, and Soubbagh, are lesser-known grape varieties that produce wines with bold flavors and are often used in blends to add structure, complexity, and aromatic profiles.Meksassi has a deep color and robust tannins while Mourad has firm tannins and dark berry notes and Soubbagh has medium body and fruity, herbal characteristics.

Notable examples of Lebanese red wines include:

- Château Musar Rouge
- Château Kefraya Comte de M
- Chateau Barka Red Royal Wine
- Chateau Barka Ishtar Red Wine
- Chateau Barka Talliya Red Wine

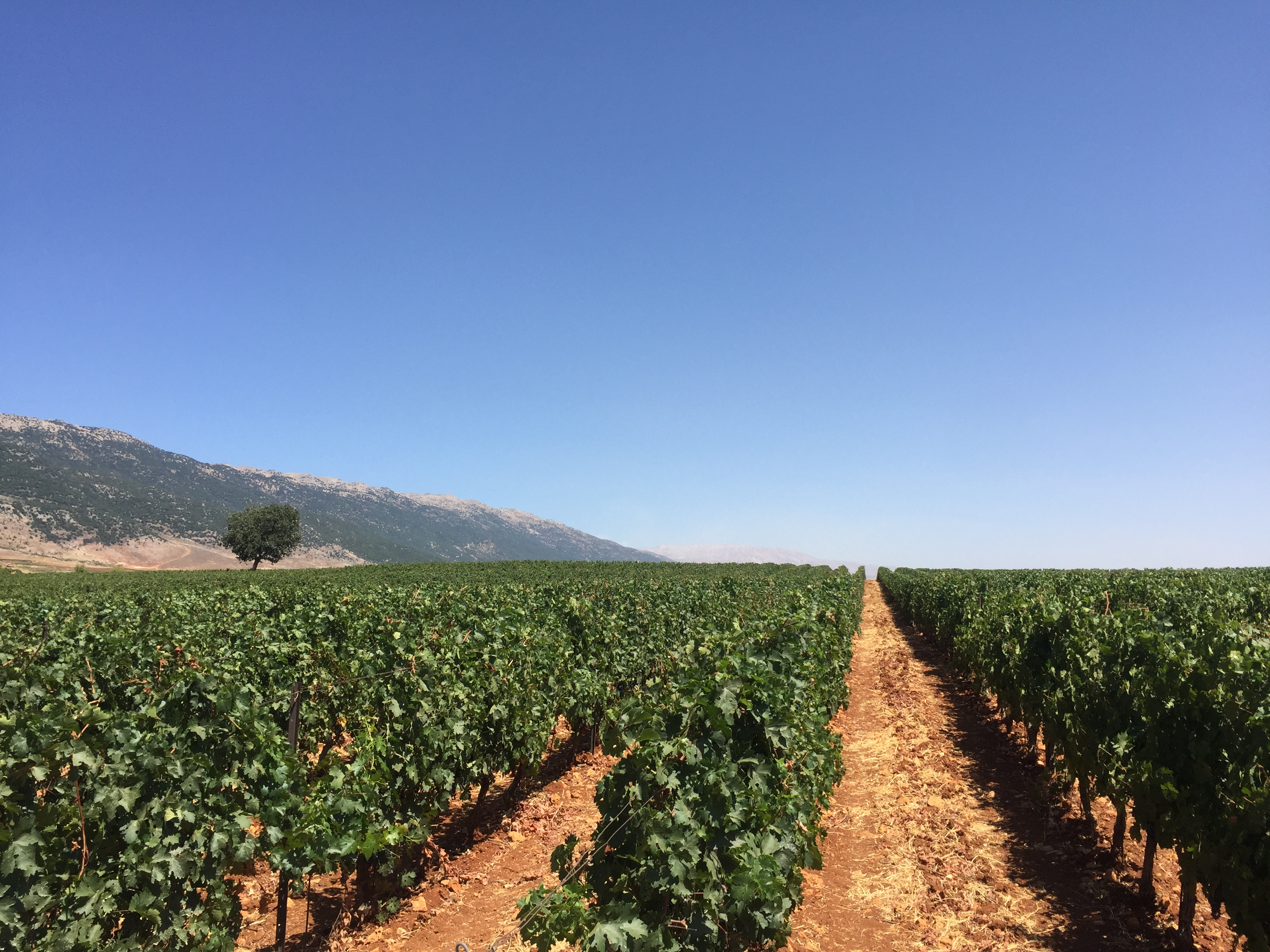
Château Marsyas vineyards

=== White varieties ===
Lebanese white wines feature Sauvignon Blanc, Chardonnay, and Viognier. They are fresh and vibrant, with aromas of tropical fruits, citrus, and floral notes. The indigenous white grapes to Lebanon are the Obaideh and Merwah.

Obeideh (also spelled "Obaideh" or "Obeidi") is high in sugar and low in acidity, producing wines with a creamy texture and imparts freshness and minerality to wines.

Merwah is valued for its disease resistance and ability to produce wines with vibrant acidity and fruity flavors, specifically subtle citrus and nutty notes.

Other lesser-known white varieties, known for their bright acidity and refreshing profile, include Tfeifihi, which produces aromatic wines with citrus, stone fruit, and floral notes, and Zeini, known for its delicate floral bouquet, green apple, pear, and citrus flavors.

Notable examples of Lebanese white wines include:

- Château Ksara Blanc de Blancs
- Ixsir Altitudes Blanc

=== Rosé and sparkling varieties ===
Lebanon also produces rosé and sparkling wines. Rosés are light and fruity, while sparkling wines offer an elegant alternative to traditional champagnes.

Rosé and sparkling wines include:

- Château Musar Rosé
- Ixsir Grande Réserve Rosé 2018
- Ksara Rosé de Ksara
- Chateau Barka Tanit Rosé

== Production ==
Lebanon's wine industry has faced political instability and economic uncertainty in recent years, but it continues to grow. The wine industry’s growth is driven by macroeconomic influences, alongside the rise of organic and biodynamic varieties, a growing wine tourism, and an increasing global recognition.

Despite challenges such as high land and labor costs, erratic energy supplies, the need for imported winemaking necessities, and the impact of climate change on water management and grape cultivation, a new generation of Lebanese winemakers has emerged.

Founded in 1997, just a year after Lebanon became a member of the International Organisation of Vine and Wine (OIV), the Union Vinicole du Liban (UVL), Lebanon's association of wine producers, aims to strengthen Lebanon’s reputation as a wine-producing nation and supports its export ambitions in markets like the EU, US, and Canada. The Union Vinicole du Liban (UVL) estimates that wineries in Lebanon produce nearly 9 million bottles annually, with around 3 million of those bottles being exported.

Wine has become an important export for the country, exporting more than 2 million bottles of wine, with Europe, North America, and Asia as its primary markets. Some wineries like Domaine des Tourelles exports around 60% of its production, with the top three international markets being the UK, Norway and Sweden. Atibaia and Domaine de Baal also export 60% of its production. Some of Lebanon's wineries with widespread distribution in the US include Château Musar, Château Kefraya, Château Ksara, Domaine des Tourelles, Massaya, and Ixsir.

Lebanon's winemakers produced 15 million bottles in 2024.As of 2025, Lebanon's wine market generates around US$65m in revenue from at-home sales and US$116m from out-of-home sales, totaling US$180m while at-home revenue is projected to grow annually by 1.06% (CAGR 2025-2029).

Winemaking has become a major employer, especially in the Bekaa, with more than 250 farming families from diverse religious and community backgrounds engaged in cultivation.

== International recognition ==
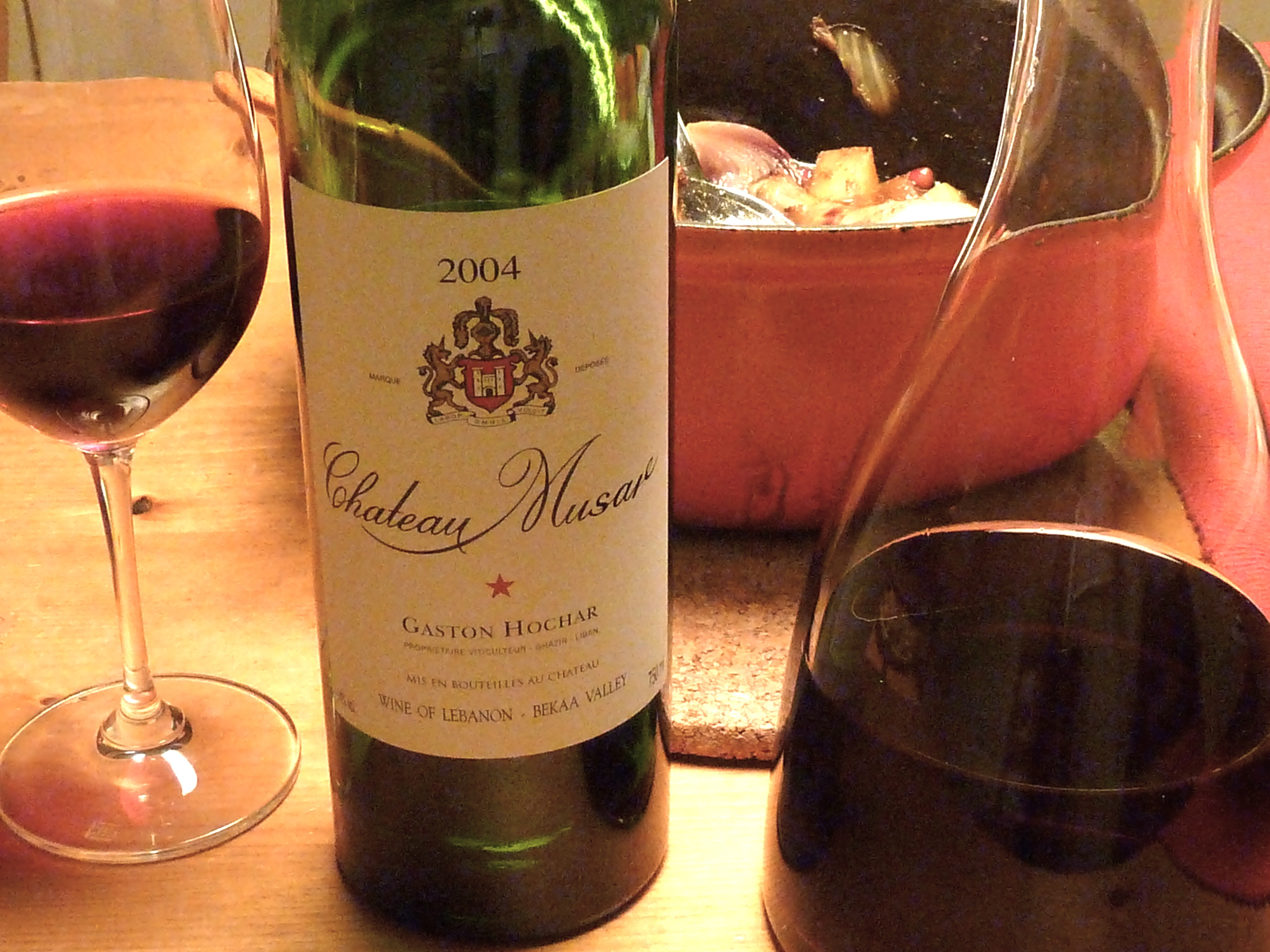
Château Musar

Lebanese wineries have earned numerous awards and accolades from renowned international wine competitions, boosting the global profile of Lebanese wines.

In addition to receiving high scores from critics like Robert Parker and Wine Spectator, Musar achieved international recognition at the Bristol Wine Fair of 1979 and for a long time was the only Lebanese wine widely available in the United Kingdom. Château Musar was ranked among the Top 100 Wineries of 2022 by Wine & Spirits.

In 2018, at the Best Wine of the World Competition (BWW), where 20,467 wines were submitted, Ixsir Grande Réserve Rosé 2018 was awarded the title of the best rosé wine in the world. Ixsir has also been awarded at the Decanter World Wine Awards and the International Wine Challenge.

In 2022, Batroun Mountains' 2017 Cabernet Sauvignon beat 543 organic wines from 19 countries to win the best red natural wine at the 15th Organic Wine Award International in Germany.

== Wine tourism ==
Wine tourism has become an important source of income for Lebanon, supporting local economic development, with many wineries drawing visitors from around the globe by offering vineyard tours, wine tastings, and culinary experiences. Tourists can easily take day trips from Beirut to explore wineries in Batroun and the Bekaa Valley.

== Wineries ==
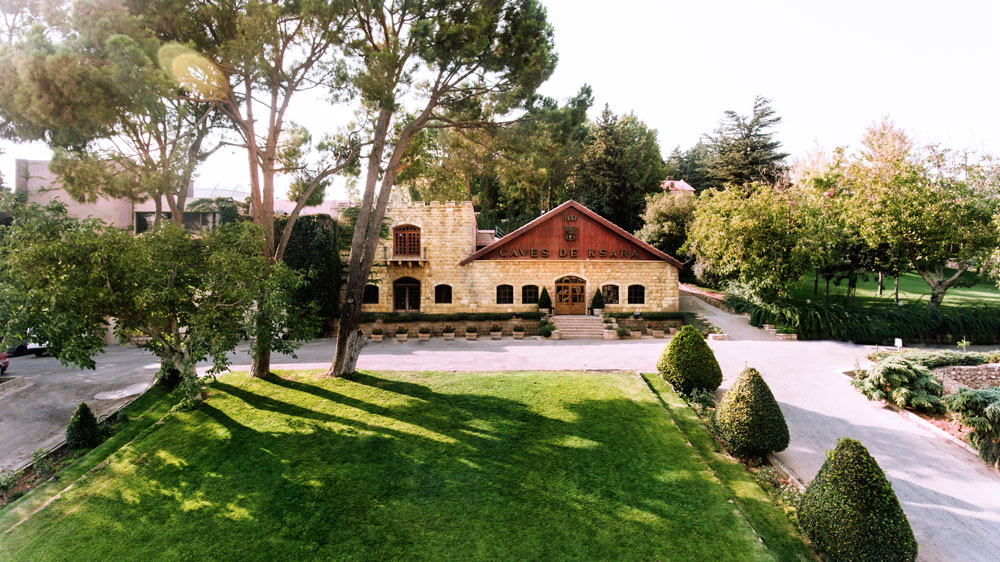
Château Ksara

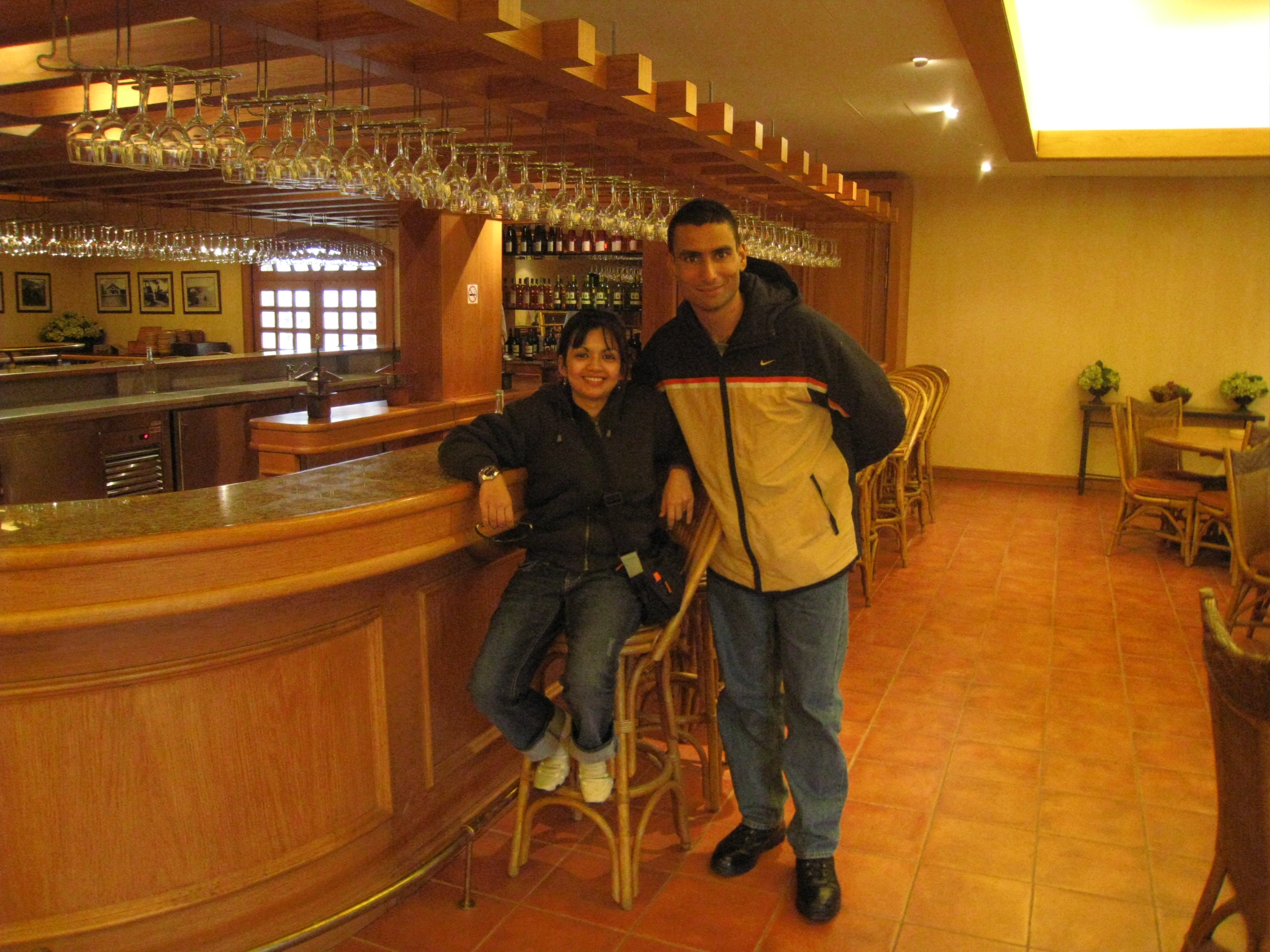
Visitors at the chateau, on a wine-tasting visit

Wineries in Lebanon were once largely confined to monasteries, such as Monastère St. Jean and Couvent St. Sauveur, as alcohol production was prohibited for centuries under Ottoman rule.

Château Ksara, founded in 1857 by Jesuit priests, is Lebanon's oldest commercial winery and largest producer, embracing the demand for local varieties like Merwah and Obeideh and holding a 70% of all the country's production for decades while nearby Domaine des Tourelles, established shortly after, led the renaissance with a focus on indigenous grapes.

Women in Lebanese wine, especially second- and third-generation daughters of winery owners, are increasingly stepping into leadership roles, with Heya Wines being an example of a winery entirely owned and run by women.

Until 1995, there were only five producers, but that number has since risen to around 50 wineries.

== See also ==
- Winemaking
- Agriculture in Lebanon
- Beer in Lebanon
- Lebanese cuisine
