= Maurice Crosbie =

Maurice Crosbie may refer to:

- Maurice Crosbie, 1st Baron Brandon (c. 1689–1762), Irish politician and peer
- Maurice Crosbie (priest) (1733–1809), his son, Anglican priest in Ireland
