= Thomas Bindon =

Thomas Bindon, LL.D (1685–1740) was an Eighteenth Century Irish Anglican priest.

After graduating from Trinity College, Dublin, he was Rector of Aghalurcher then Dean of Limerick.

Church of Ireland titles
Preceded by George Warter Story	Dean of Limerick; 1722–1740	Succeeded by Charles Massy
