= Charles Massy =

Dean of Limerick (1695–1766)

Charles Massy (1695–1766) was Dean of Limerick from 1740 until his death.

He was educated at Trinity College, Dublin. He was Chancellor of Emly from 1727 to 1739; and then Precentor. His nephew George Massy was Archdeacon of Ardfert from 1772 to 1782.

Massy’s daughter Grace married William Barton (1723–1792), of Grove House, Fethard, County Tipperary, and was the mother of several children, including Lt. General Charles Barton, General Sir Robert Barton, and Thomas Barton, a member of the Irish House of Commons.

Church of Ireland titles
Preceded by Thomas Bindon	Dean of Limerick; 1740–1766	Succeeded by John Averell
