= Bottle variation =

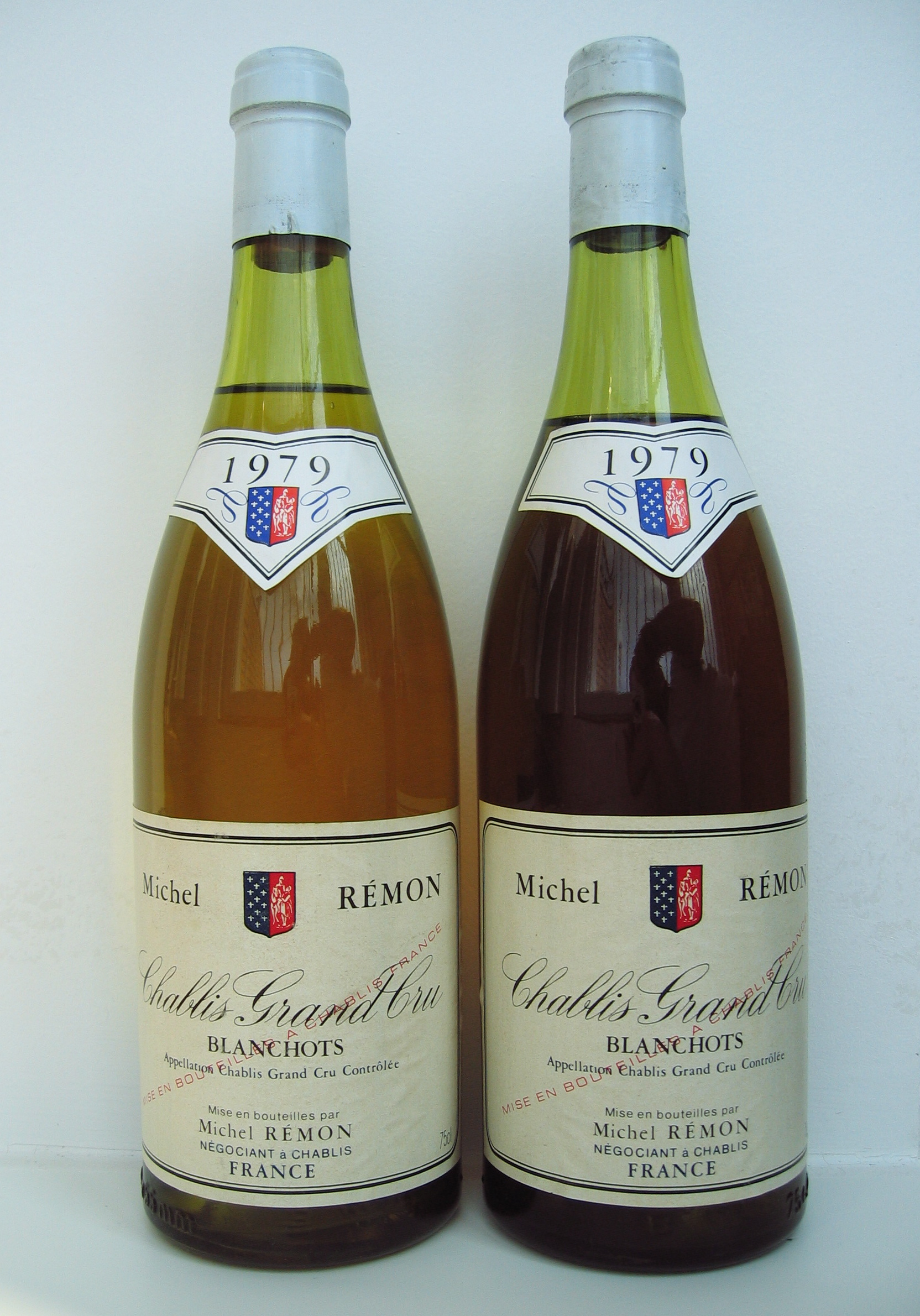
Two bottles of the same Chablis Grand Cru wine showing considerable variation in colour at 30 years of age. The darker colour of the right-hand bottle indicates considerably more oxidation in this bottle. Since the fill level of this bottle is also slightly lower, a slightly faulty cork seal is likely the cause.

Bottle variation is the degree to which different bottles, nominally of the same product, can have different taste, smell, etc.

There are many possible causes of bottle variation:

- variation in the contents prior to packaging
- variation in the packaging components
- variation in the product and packaging processes
- variation in storage, distribution, cold chain, etc.
- variation in the quantity of contents

== Wine ==
Different bottles, nominally of the same wine, can taste and smell different.

One factor is found in the variable oxygen transmission rate (OTR) of cork stoppers, which translates to a degree of bottle variation.

Before the advent of inexpensive stainless steel tanks, it was not customary to blend all the wine together and bottle it at once, a process called assemblage. Instead, the winemaker would take his or her siphon from barrel to barrel and fill the bottles from a single barrel at a time. Some traditional and/or idiosyncratic wineries still do this, including Château Musar. Also, buyers and sellers of bulk wine typically do not have access to a multi-million litre tank, and so often the wine will vary depending on which tank it came from.

Bottle variation that increases over time typically comes from the packaging. Exposure to heat or light can cause a wine to mature more quickly or even make it taste "cooked". Bottles aged in the chilly cellars of Sweden's alcohol monopoly are famous for tasting younger than the same wine stored at a more typical 13 °C (55 °F). Finally, not all corks seal equally well, and a faulty cork will allow air into the bottle, oxidizing it prematurely. However, a corked wine would be described as a simple fault rather than bottle variation, even though the corked bottle would be clearly different from a non-corked example.

Sometimes, it is not clear what causes the variation. Bottles stored together their entire lives, with no obvious faults, can taste completely different. Thus there is a saying, "There are no great old wines, only great bottles."

== See also ==
- Aging of wine
