= Château Langoa-Barton =

Coordinates: 45.15782°N 0.74008°W

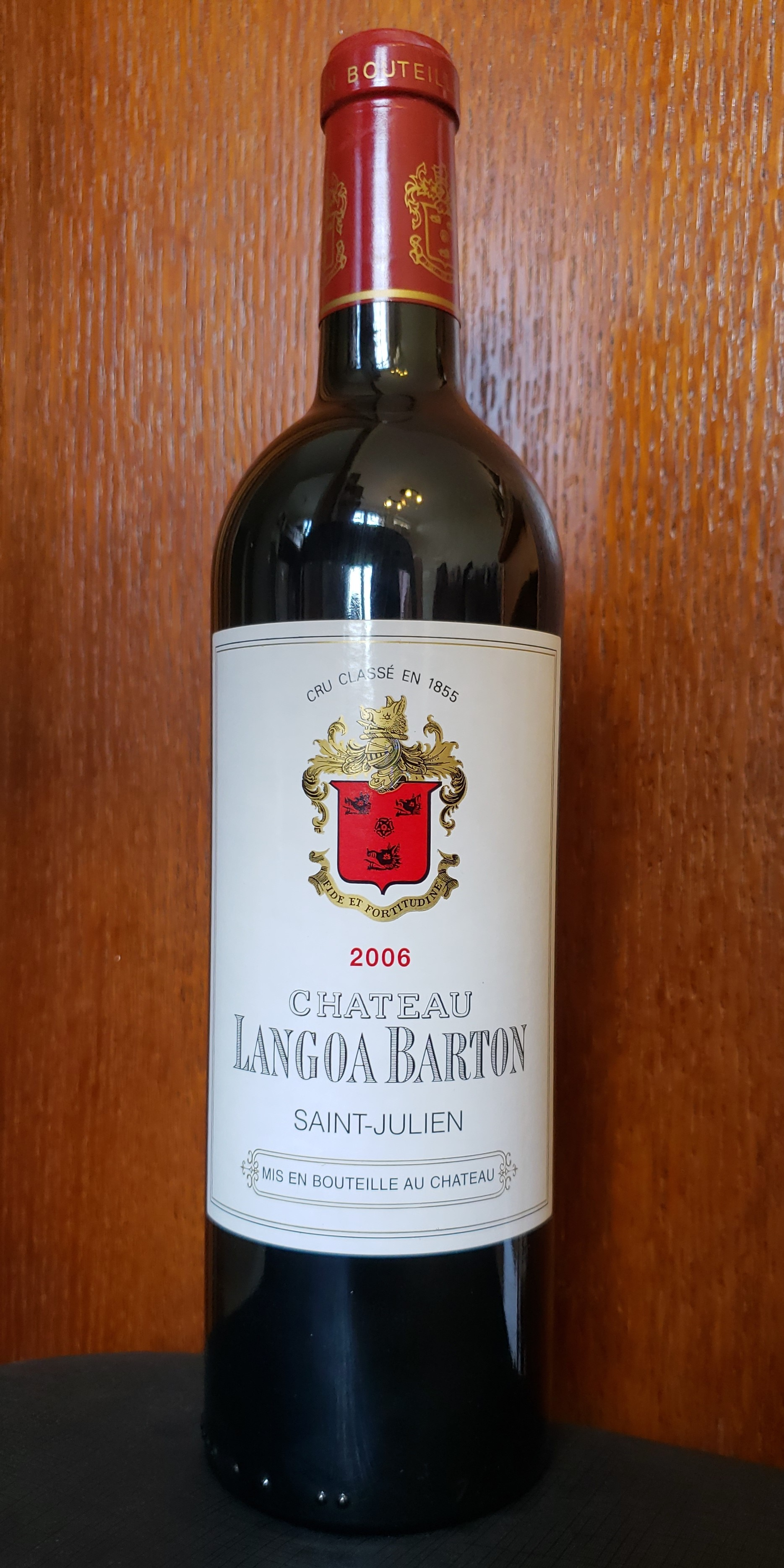
Grand Vin 2006

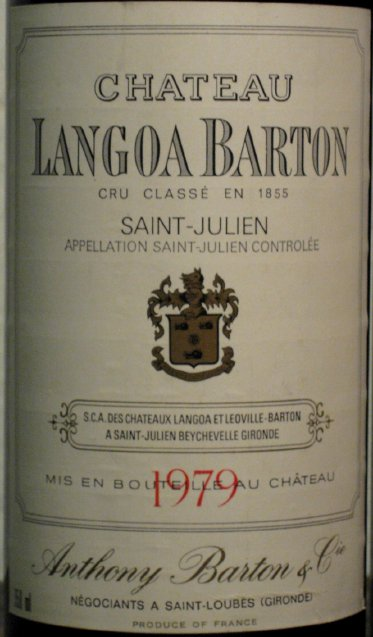
Detail of a label of Château Langoa Barton

Château Langoa-Barton (archaically named Pontet Langlois) is a winery in the Saint-Julien appellation of the Bordeaux region of France. Château Langoa-Barton is also the name of the red wine produced by this property. The wine produced here was classified as one of fourteen Troisièmes Crus (Third Growths) in the historic Bordeaux Wine Official Classification of 1855.

== History of Château ==
Château Langoa-Barton (where the main building dates from 1755) was purchased in 1821 by the Anglo-Irishman Hugh Barton, a brother of General Charles Barton, and has remained in the Barton family since. Hugh Barton was the grandson of an Irish wine merchant, Thomas Barton. He fled to Dublin during the French Revolution, having left the business of his French partner. On his return, he invested in two Bordeaux vineyards. At the time of its purchase, the estate was known as Pontet-Langlois, and was renamed to its current designation. Five years later, the second purchase was made of land without buildings that had been part of Château Leoville Las Cases, and the purchased estate became renamed as Château Léoville Barton

The cellars of the estate are some of the largest in the region. They generally contain 8-10,000 hogsheads of wine and approximately 500,000 bottles of wine. In 1940 the German authorities were in course of confiscating bottles as enemy property, but the process was halted by proof of the Irish nationality of the owner. The Republic of Ireland was a non-combatant in the Second World War. Consequently older vintages survived the Second World War in the hands of the Barton family.

In 1983, Anthony Barton took over the ownership and administration of the estate. In 1968 he had created his own wine agency, Les Vins fins Anthony Barton.

Upon his death on 19 January 2022, the practical management continued in the hands of Liliam Barton Sartorius. Anthony Barton was a much liked and respected figure in the wine world. His biography appears in The Times for 16 February 2022. Liliam Barton Sartorius is the only woman in seven generations to have been in charge of running the family estates. She is one of several women increasingly undertaking this profession at the top level. In 2011 the family bought a further vineyard at Château Mauvesin. This is designated AOC Moulis-Médoc and the 60 hectare property (55 under vine cultivation) was renamed Mauvesin Barton.

Damien Barton, one of Liliam Barton Sartorius' two sons, has engaged in efforts to establish sustainability including a returnable glass bottles scheme in London so as to promote climate-friendly practice. He also manages "225", a line of climate-friendly Bordeaux wines transported in bulk for bottling in the UK. The Barton family worked in partnership with Borough Wines in accessing the UK market.

== Production ==
Located in the center of the appellation along the banks of the Gironde river, Langoa-Barton has roughly 37 acres (15 ha) under vine. The plantings are divided as follows: 70% Cabernet Sauvignon, 20% Merlot, 8% Cabernet Franc, and 2% Petit Verdot. Typical of the area, the soil composition of the vineyard is composed of a gravel topsoil over a clay sub-stratum. Some of the vines were planted in 1953 but the policy is to maintain an average age of 35 years. There are c 9,100 plantings per hectare.

Château Langoa-Barton shares its cellar with its sibling Château Léoville-Barton, and though the red wines share similar upbringing in the cellar, Langoa-Barton generally ends up as the lighter style of the two. About 7,000 cases of Château Langoa-Barton are produced in an average vintage. This Langoa-Barton has a less warm terroir than its sibling and is directly south of it. Wines are traditionally produced using 200 hectolitre oak vats for fermentation. A percentage of the vines (approximately 10%) are organically managed. The direct connection between wine quality and investment in new oak casks periodically was much commented on by Anthony Barton in 1988 at a point when a decade of generally excellent vintages had allowed that to happen.

Château Langoa-Barton is a third growth in the famous classification of 1855, whereas Château Léoville-Barton is a second growth and therefore generally sold for considerably more. However, the recognised quality of the Château Langoa-Barton is much higher than the difference in their prices might suggest. In 2022, Château Langoa-Barton won its place in the top five wines listing for St Julien, and its 2022 vintage was described as "a monumental example of Langoa-Barton with wonderful depth and richness." The efforts to improve the climate sustainability despite the recent hot summers in France have been successful. In 2022 the Château Langoa-Barton vintage was described as "charming" and "balanced."

== People and Events ==
On 15 January 1885, parcels of Château Langoa-Barton were sold (alongside others in the cellar) at the London auction house, having been part of the estate of James Cathcart, deceased. The wines to be sold were described as all "of the highest character."

A consignment of Château Langoa-Barton 1874 was shipped and delivered to Montreal in May 1888, having arrived ex Thomson Line SS Avlona, thus reflecting its North American connection. Château Langoa-Barton had been shipped to Montreal since at least 1843. The import process was undisturbed by the American Civil War (deliveries landing before and after it in 1863 and 1865).

In 1972 H. Ronald Barton CBE went to the United States in order to open two of the three then still remaining bottles of Château Langoa-Barton 1887 vintage. The first bottle was opened in New York at Le Chambertin, a renowned French restaurant situated on W 46th St in New York City. Though the cork crumbled, the tasting panel pronounced the colour pleasingly deep and the wine drinkable. The occasion was to celebrate the 150th anniversary of the purchase of the vineyard by the Barton family.

Serge Hochar trained with Ronald Barton at Château Langoa-Barton and Château Léoville-Barton. Hochar was the son of Gaston Hochar who in 1930 had purchased the vineyard Chateau Musar in the Lebanon. Under Serge Hochar, the Lebanese product became well-recommended by the 1980s in the United States.

On Tuesday 8 June 1982 Queen Elizabeth II staged a white-tie banquet (158 guests) at Windsor Castle for United States President Ronald Reagan and Mrs Nancy Reagan. Amongst the five wines served that evening was a 1971 Château Langoa-Barton.

In 1983, the 1929 Langoa was professionally hailed in New York as being as strong and as appealing as a wine 50 years younger.

== Gallery ==
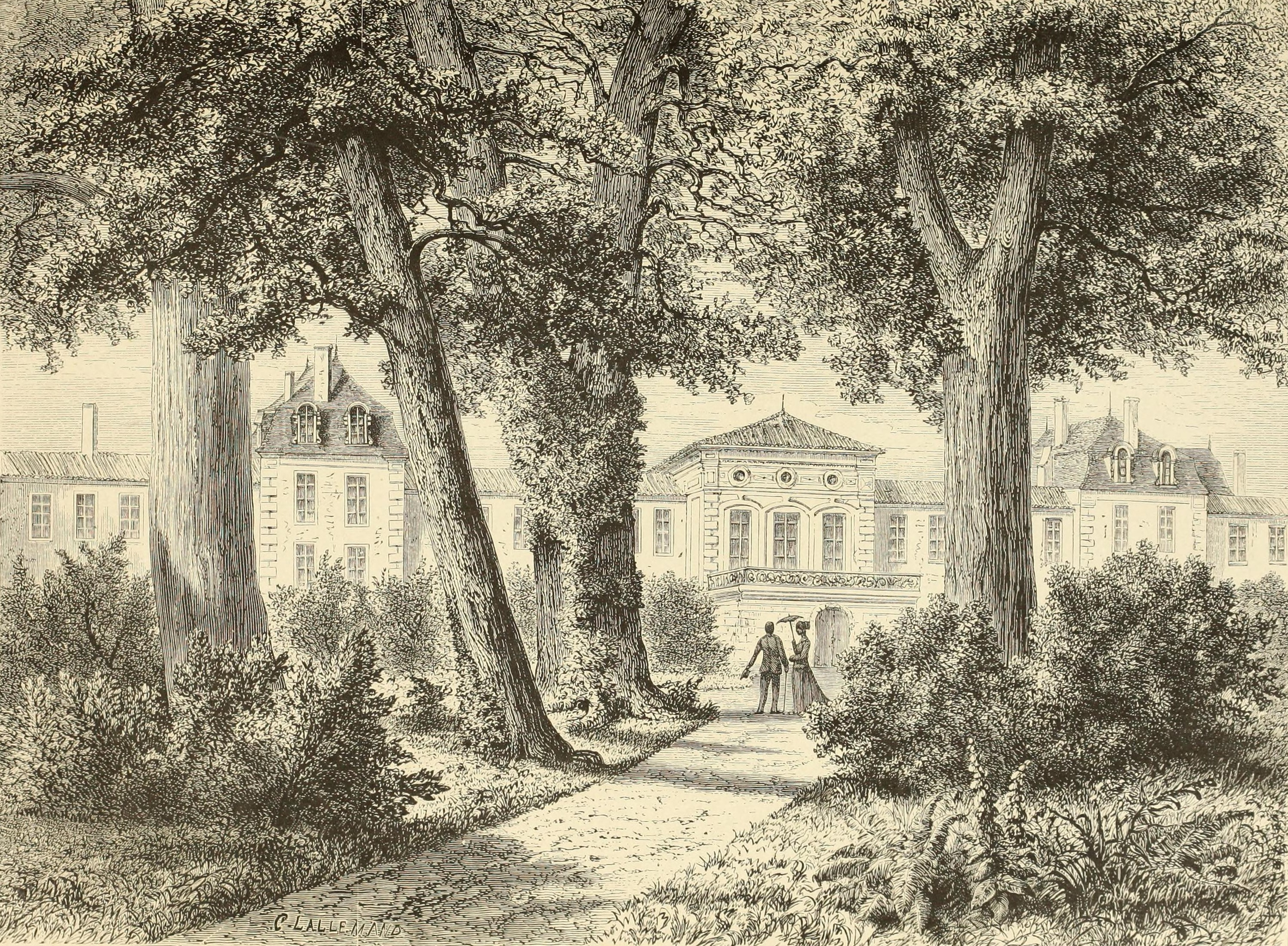
Château Langoa Barton in 1838

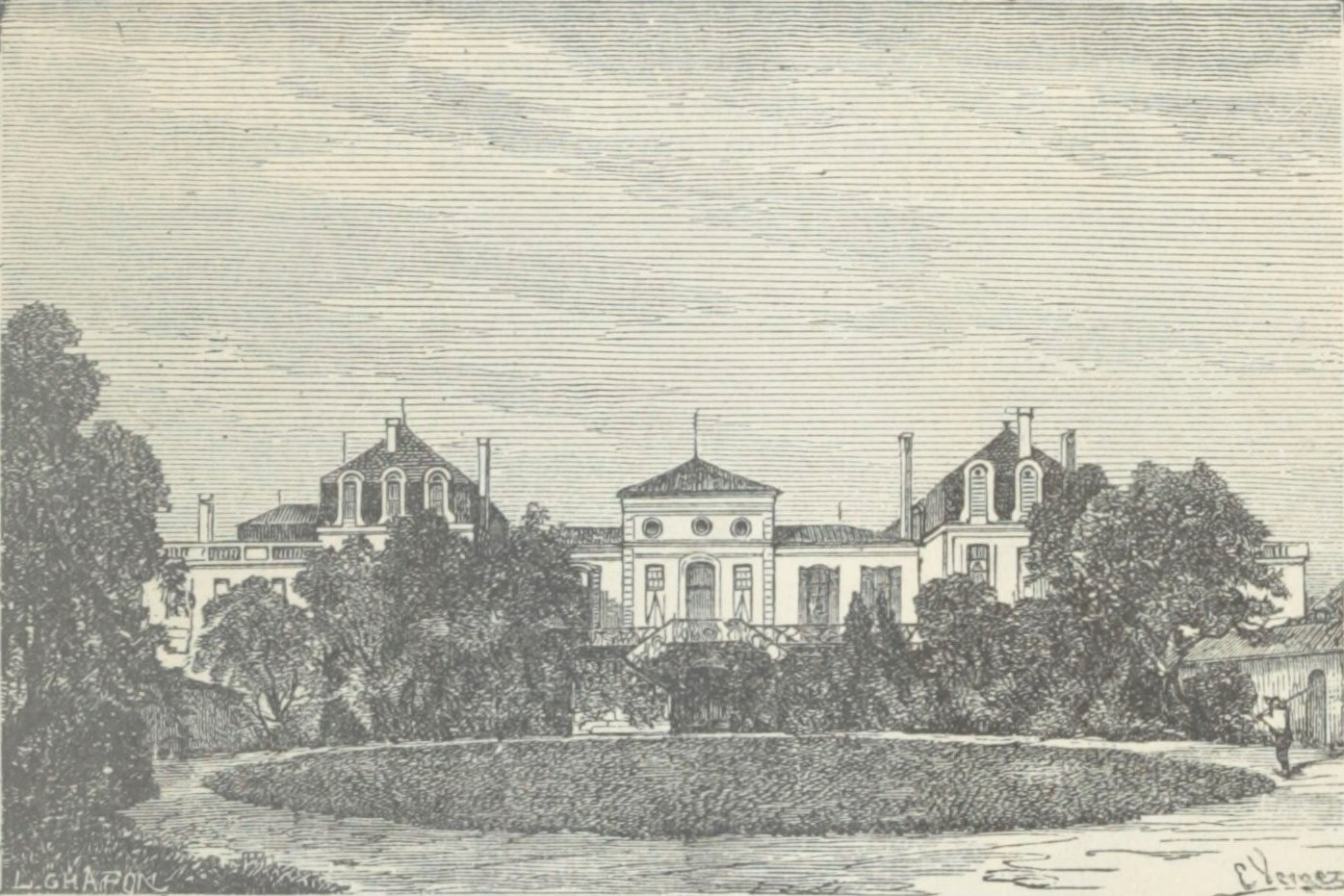
Château Langoa Barton in 1898

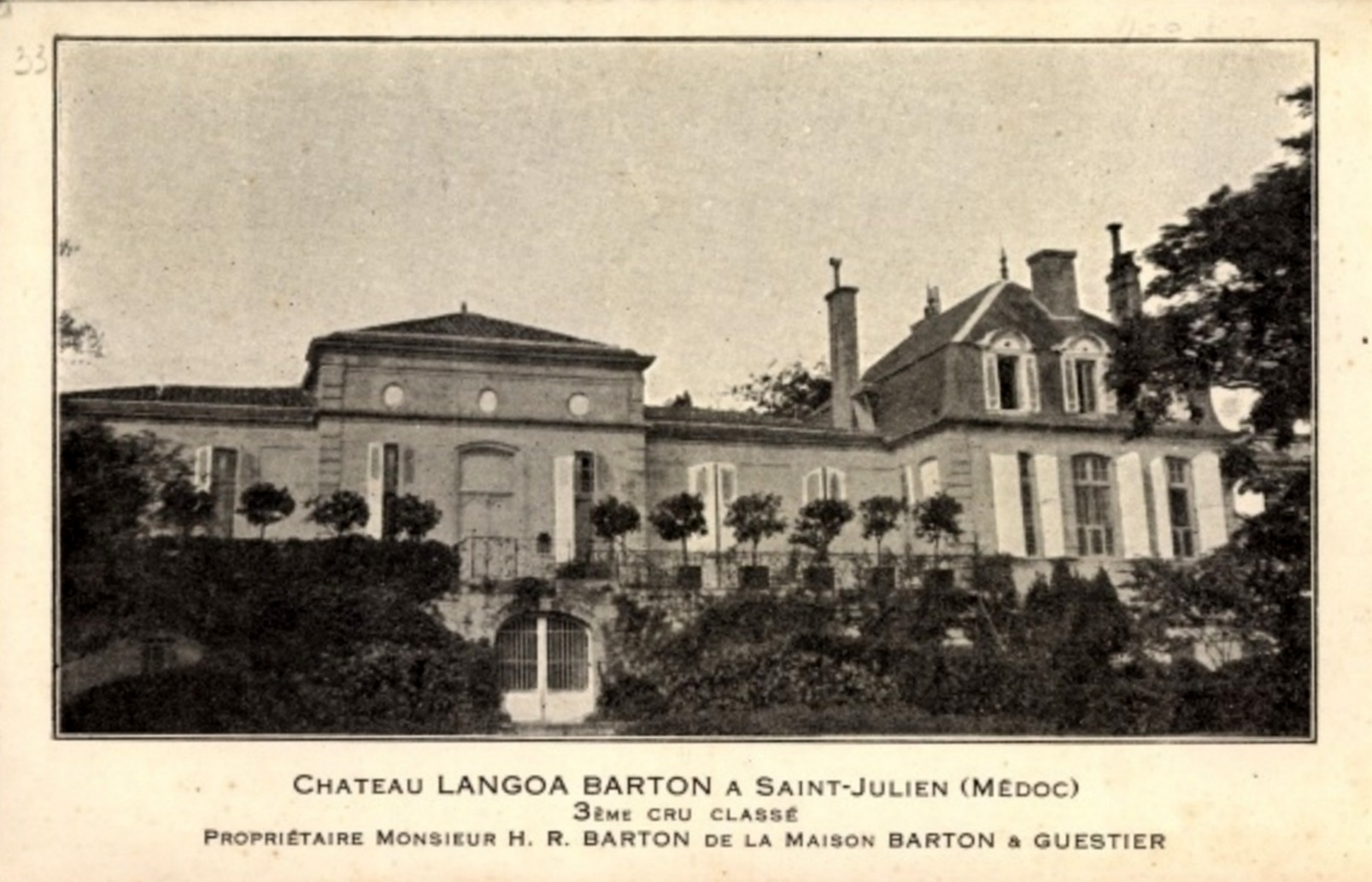
Château Langoa Barton c 1900-1905
