= Emily Mary Barton =

Australian poet

- Born: Emily Mary Darvall c. 1817; England
- Died: 1909 (aged 91–92); Gladesville, Sydney, Australia
- Occupation: Poet
- Spouse: Robert Johnston Barton (m. 1840; died 1863)
- Children: 8
- Relatives: Banjo Paterson (grandson)

Emily Mary Barton (c. 1817–1909) was an English-born Australian poet. She wrote poetry for most of her life, and was still publishing when she was 90. She was the grandmother of Andrew Barton (Banjo) Paterson.

== Early life and education ==
Emily Mary Darvall was born in 1817 in England. Her parents were Major Edward Darvall and Emily Darvall née Johnson. She was the eldest daughter of the Darvall's seven children, and the fourth child. In 1839, Major Darvall and five of his children set off for the colony of New South Wales, his second son John Bayley Darvall having travelled to New South Wales five months earlier.

Barton had a classical education, having spent some of her early life in Belgium and France.

== Career ==
In 1840, Emily married Robert Johnstone Barton, a son of Lt. General Charles Barton. Her husband was a retired naval officer turned grazier, and they met on the voyage to Australia, aboard the Alfred. They had eight children. He died on 4 October 1863 at the Australian Club in Sydney, aged 54. The Bartons' elder daughters, Emily and Rose, married the brothers John and Andrew Paterson.

Her letters to her family and friends often contained verses, and she contributed to the entertainment on board during the trip to Australia with poems and verses.

Barton died at her home, "Rock End", Gladesville, New South Wales, on 24 August 1909. Following a funeral service at Christ Church, Gladesville, her remains were interred at St. Anne's Cemetery, Ryde.

== Selected works ==
- A Few of Granmamma's Prizes for the Little Ones. Sydney Gibbs, Shallard and Co., 1885
- Straws on the Stream. Sydney [The Author] 1907
- Straws on the Stream. Sydney W. E. Smith 1910. This collection, with the same name as the earlier, self-published edition, was published post-humously.
