= Chateau Musar =

Winery in Lebanon

Chateau Musar is a Lebanese winery located in Ghazir, Lebanon, 24 kilometres (15 mi) north of the capital Beirut. Musar grapes grow in the Beqaa Valley, a fertile sunny valley at an elevation of 1,000 metres (3,300 ft), situated 40 km (25 mi) east of Beirut.

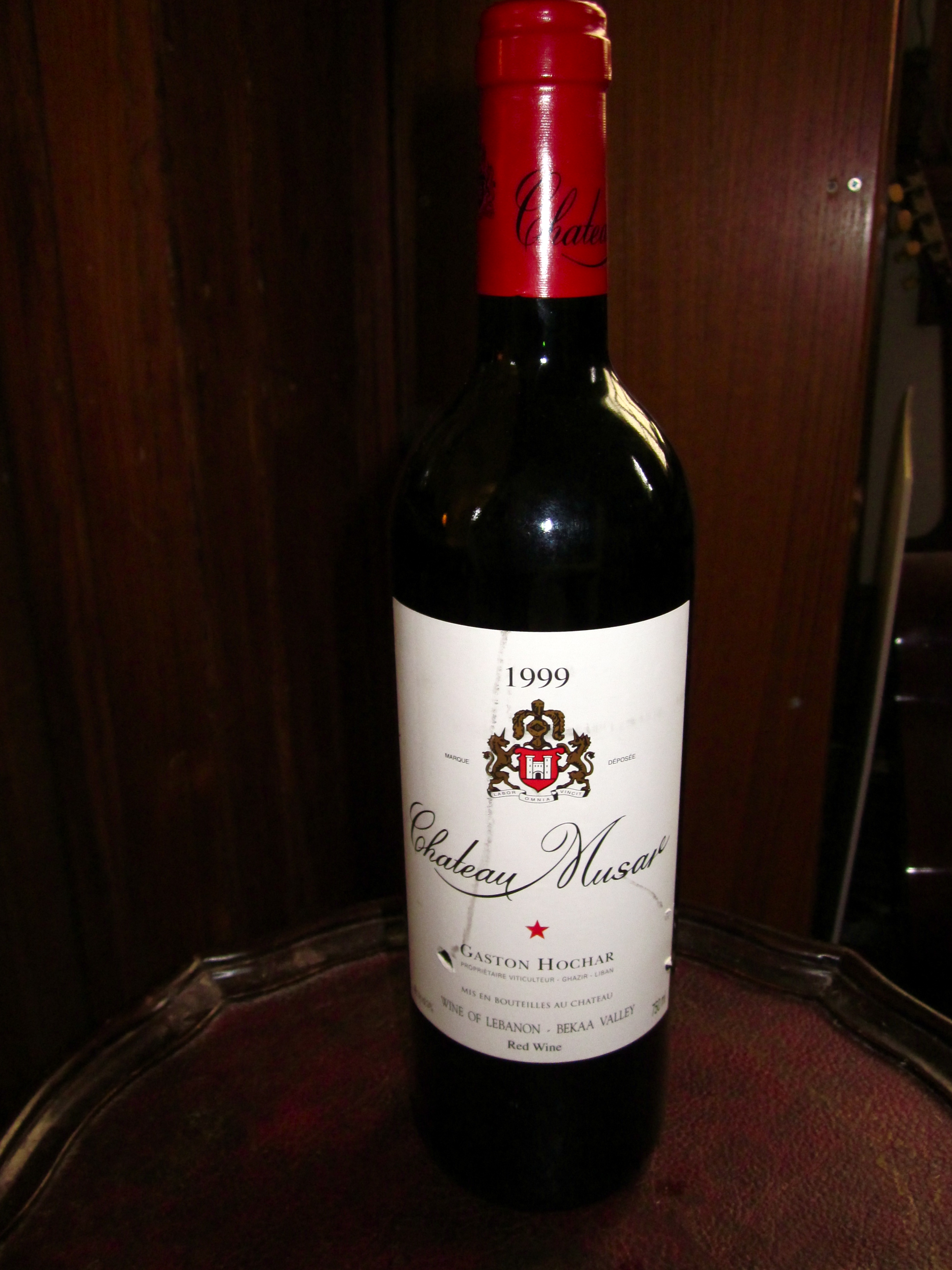
Bottle of Chateau Musar 1999

== History ==
The winery was established by Gaston Hochar in 1930 after returning from Bordeaux. Gaston Hochar was succeeded by his sons, Ronald and Serge Hochar, with the latter managing the estate from 1959 until his death from a swimming accident in Mexico in 2014, and Ronald Hochar assuming marketing and finance department responsibilities from 1962. Serge Hochar's sons have succeeded him at the winery. Gaston Hochar is now in charge of the day-to-day running of the winery, and Marc Hochar is in charge of the winery's commercial aspects.

In the 1930s and 1940s when Lebanon was under French control, the winery was an important customer for local French Army troops stationed in Lebanon. A French officer named Ronald Barton (whom Gaston named his second son after), and was stationed in Lebanon, was highly influential to the early development of Chateau Musar's wines, as Barton was affiliated with the Bordeaux wineries Château Langoa-Barton and Château Léoville Barton.

In 1959, Serge Hochar becomes Chateau Musar winemaker, while completing his winemaking studies at the University of Oenology in Bordeaux, under the tutelage of Jean Riberau and Emile Peynaud.

Before the Lebanese Civil War (1975–1990), the Chateau Musar wines were mostly sold to domestic markets, however the war changed that. Gaston Hochar's son Ronald Hochar helped market the wine abroad and from the late 1970s and early 1980s the wine became more popular abroad.

The international discovery of Musar took place at the Bristol Wine Fair of 1979 when auctioneer and taster Michael Broadbent and journalist Roger Voss selected Musar 1967 as the "discovery of the Fair".

Despite war in Lebanon and frequent tension, with the exception of the 1976 vintage, wine has been produced at the Château every year, with employees sometimes working under high-risk conditions. (1984 was made, despite difficulties in transporting the grapes to the winery. It has not yet been released commercially.) The 1992 red Chateau Musar production was declassified due to a weak vintage.

Though comparisons are sometimes made with Bordeaux wine, Burgundy wine or Rhône wine, it is most frequently maintained that the wine of Musar is unique. Due to the winemaking philosophy of Serge Hochar, its vintages are notoriously inconsistent.

== Production ==
The red wine, which is the best known is made from Cabernet Sauvignon, Cinsault, Carignan, Grenache, and Mourvèdre grapes in varying amounts each year. The whites are made from Obaideh (related to Chardonnay) and Merwah (related to Sémillon). Both wines contain classic Bordeaux grapes, however they are very different, as they are made in a natural wine style with significant bottle variation. The wines generally improve with age, both the red and whites.

They also produce a single vineyard wine, Hochar, which is similar to the red Musar but is oak aged for only 9 months, and can be drunk younger, as well as the Cuvée Musar range, both produced as a red, white and a rosé.
