= Chateau Barka =

Lebanese vineyard

Chateau Barka (شاتو برقا) is a family-owned winery located in Barka village, in the Northern Bekaa Valley of Lebanon. Founded and operated by the five Geagea brothers.

== History ==
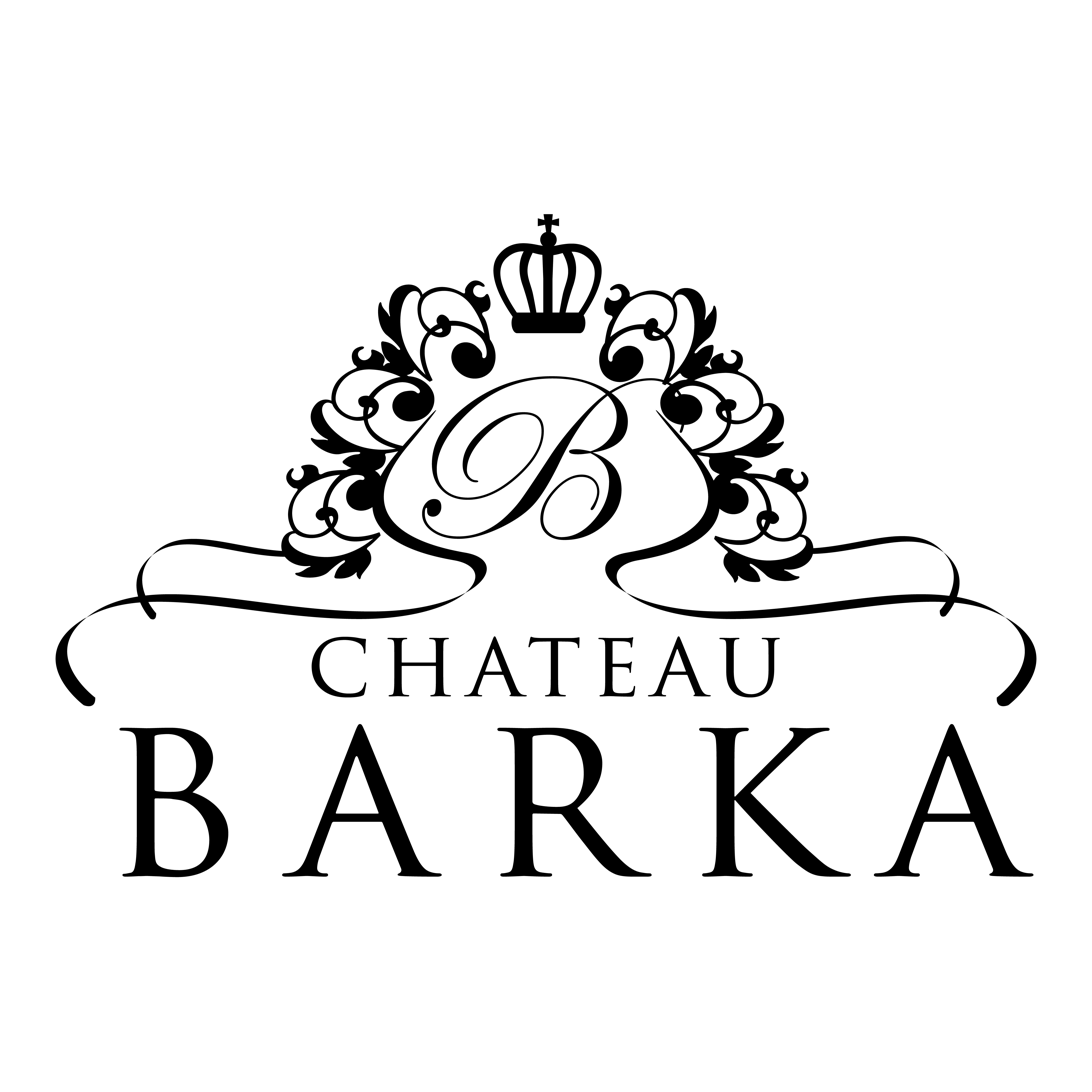
Chateau Barka Logo.

Chateau Barka was established in 2009 by the five Geagea brothers: Sleiman, Ehsan, Hamdan, Hicham and Rakan, who brought together their shared passion for wine and agriculture. One of the founding brothers, Hicham Geagea, has served as the winery’s winemaker since its inception. Over the years, Chateau Barka has grown from a local vineyard into a globally recognized Lebanese wine brand, exporting wines to more than a dozen countries across Europe, North America, Africa, and Australia.

== Winemaking Philosophy ==
Chateau Barka’s winemaking is led by Hicham Geagea, who has held the role since the winery’s first vintage in 2009. Geagea holds academic degrees in biology, food biochemistry, and viticulture/oenology from SupAgro Montpellier in France. His training in France and Italy combines scientific and practical approaches to winemaking.

== Terroir ==
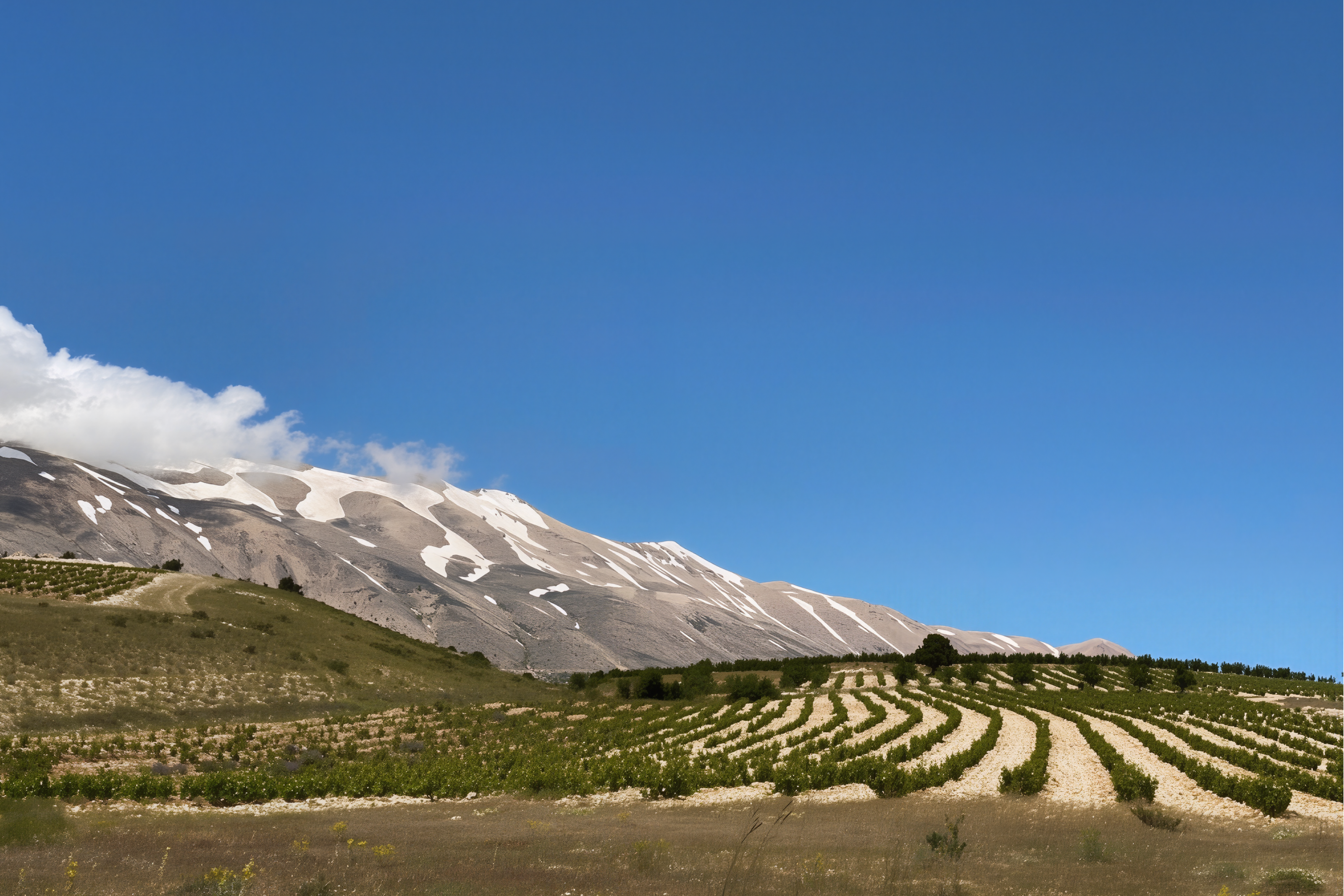
Chateau Barka Vineyards, Bekaa Valley, Lebanon.

Chateau Barka’s vineyards are located at elevations ranging from 1,450 to 1,700 meters above sea level in the Northern Bekaa Valley, an area considered among the highest winegrowing regions in the Northern Hemisphere. The region features calcareous clay and iron-rich soils, along with significant diurnal temperature variation between hot summer days and cooler autumn nights. These conditions contribute to a gradual ripening process, which can influence acidity levels and aromatic development in the grapes.

== Products ==
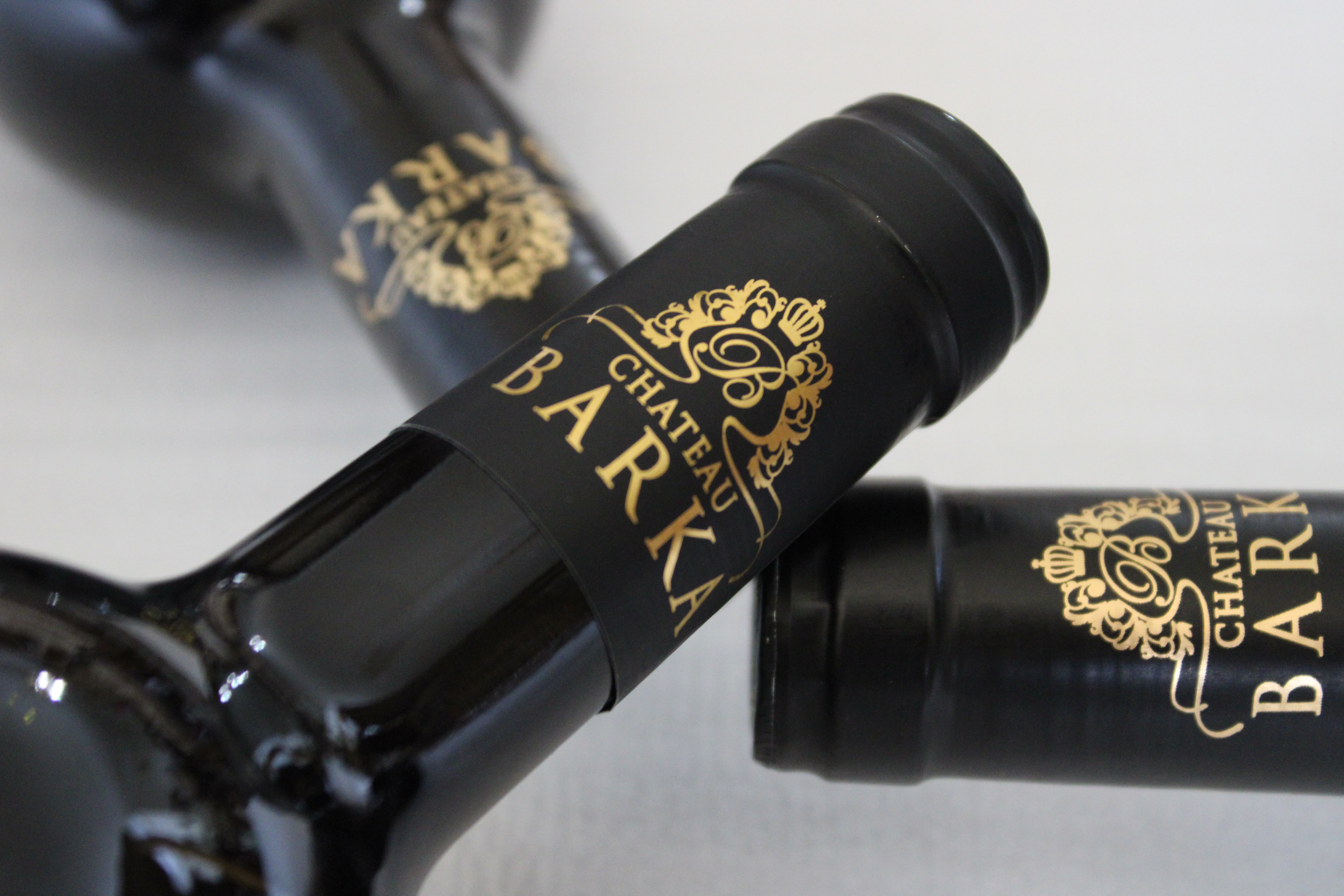
Chateau Barka Label.

The winery produces a range of red, white, and rosé wines, as well as arak with several wines named after Phoenician goddesses:

- Royal Red Wine
- Ishtar Red Wine
- Talliya Red Wine
- Tanit Rosé Wine
- Atargatis White Wine
- Sweet Red Wine
- Lebanese Authentic Traditional Arak

== International Recognition and Awards ==
- In 2025, Chateau Barka's Tanit Rosé (Vintage 2023) achieved a Silver Medal at the Global Rosé Masters competition organized by the Drinks Business.
- In 2023, Chateau Barka won three medals at the International Wine Challenge (IWC):
  - Bronze Medal – Chateau Barka’s Royal Red (Vintage 2017)
  - Bronze Medal – Talliya Red Wine (Vintage 2018)
  - Commended Award – Atargatis White Wine (Vintage 2020)
- In 2021, Chateau Barka was ranked among “The Best Wineries in Lebanon” by Falstaff; the leading magazine in the realms of wine, food, and travel.
- In 2021, Talliya Red (Vintage 2016) was evaluated by Falstaff wine critics Dominik Vombach and Benjamin Herzog and received 89 Falstaff points.
- In 2020, Chateau Barka secured two medals at the France International Wine Awards (FIWA) 2020:
  - Gold Medal – Ishtar Red (Vintage 2015)
  - Silver Medal – Chateau Barka Royal Red (Vintage 2014)
- In 2019, Chateau Barka’s Royal Red (Vintage 2013) won a Gold Medal at France International Wine Awards 2019.
- In 2019, three Chateau Barka wines were featured in Vinum’s 2019 Lebanon Guide:
  - Chateau Barka Royal Red (Vintage 2012):17/20
  - Ishtar Red (Vintage 2012): 16.5/20
  - Atargatis White (Vintage 2017): 16/20
