= Thomas Barton (Irish MP) =

Irish landowner and politician (1757–1820)

Thomas Barton (26 January 1757 – 1820) of Grove House and Clonmel, County Tipperary, and St Stephen's Green, Dublin, was an Irish landowner and politician.

== Biography ==
He was born in 1757, the eldest son of William Barton of Fethard, County Tipperary, and his wife, Grace, daughter of Charles Massy, Dean of Limerick, and was educated at Trinity College, Dublin and THe Middle Temple. His younger brothers included two Generals, Charles Barton and Sir Robert Barton.

The Bartons were proprietors of the town of Fethard, and Thomas was elected a Freeman and Burgess of Fethard in 1780 and served as Sovereign (i.e. mayor) from 1787 to 1788, 1791 to 1792, 1801 to 1802 and 1811 to 1814. He also served as Recorder from 1801 to 1809, and represented the borough in the Irish House of Commons from 1783 to 1797. In 1785, he was sheriff of the county. When Fethard was disenfranchised at the Act of Union 1800, the compensation for loss of a pocket borough was divided between Barton and the family of Cornelius O'Callaghan, 1st Baron Lismore.

In 1786, Barton married Mary, daughter of Chambré Brabazon Ponsonby; they had four sons and two daughters. He died in 1820.
