= Château Léoville Barton =

Coordinates: 45.15739°N 0.73925°W

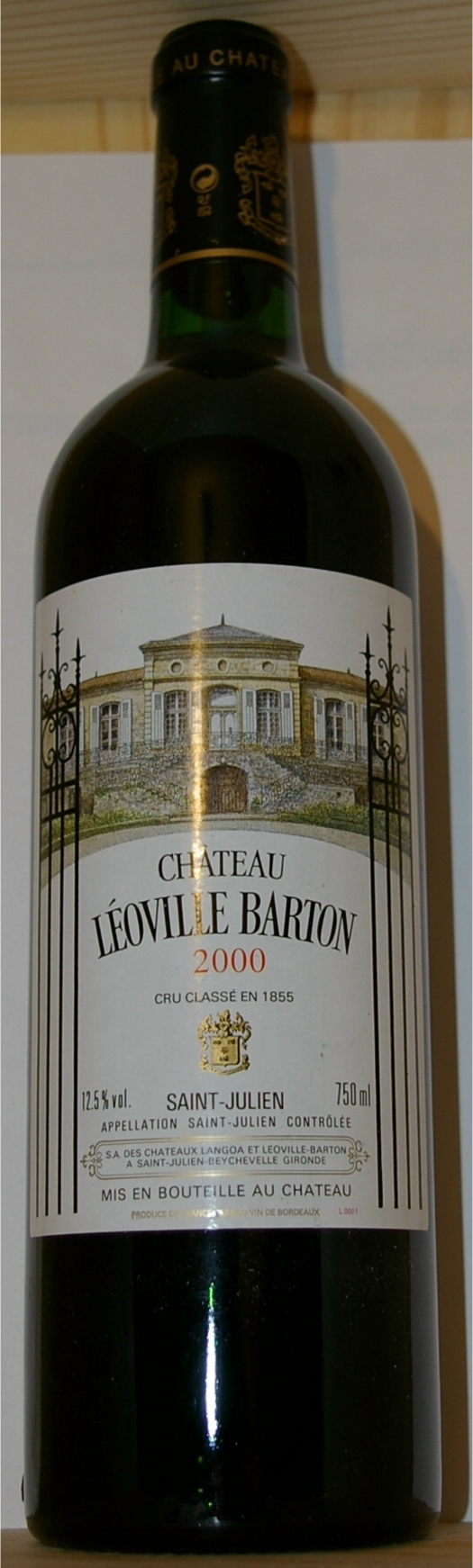
A bottle of the 2000 Château Léoville Barton

Château Léoville Barton is a vineyard in the Saint-Julien appellation of the Bordeaux region of France. Château Léoville Barton is also the name of the red wine produced by this property. The wine produced here was classified as one of fifteen Deuxièmes Crus (Second Growths) in the original Bordeaux Wine Official Classification of 1855.

Unlike many of its peers, Château Léoville Barton has no château building; the wines are made at Château Langoa-Barton with which it shares ownership. The château depicted on Léoville Barton's label is that of Château Langoa Barton.

== History ==
Léoville Barton, along with Château Léoville-Las Cases and Château Léoville-Poyferré was once part of the vast Léoville estate. The estate was purchased by Hugh Barton in 1826, and continues to be owned by the Barton family, of Irish descent. The current owner Anthony Barton began running the estate in 1983, along with its sister property Château Langoa Barton. The previous owner was Anthony's uncle Ronald, who died in 1986. The two St. Julien properties have the longest continuous duration of ownership by the same family of any of the other current proprietors in Bordeaux.

== Vineyard ==
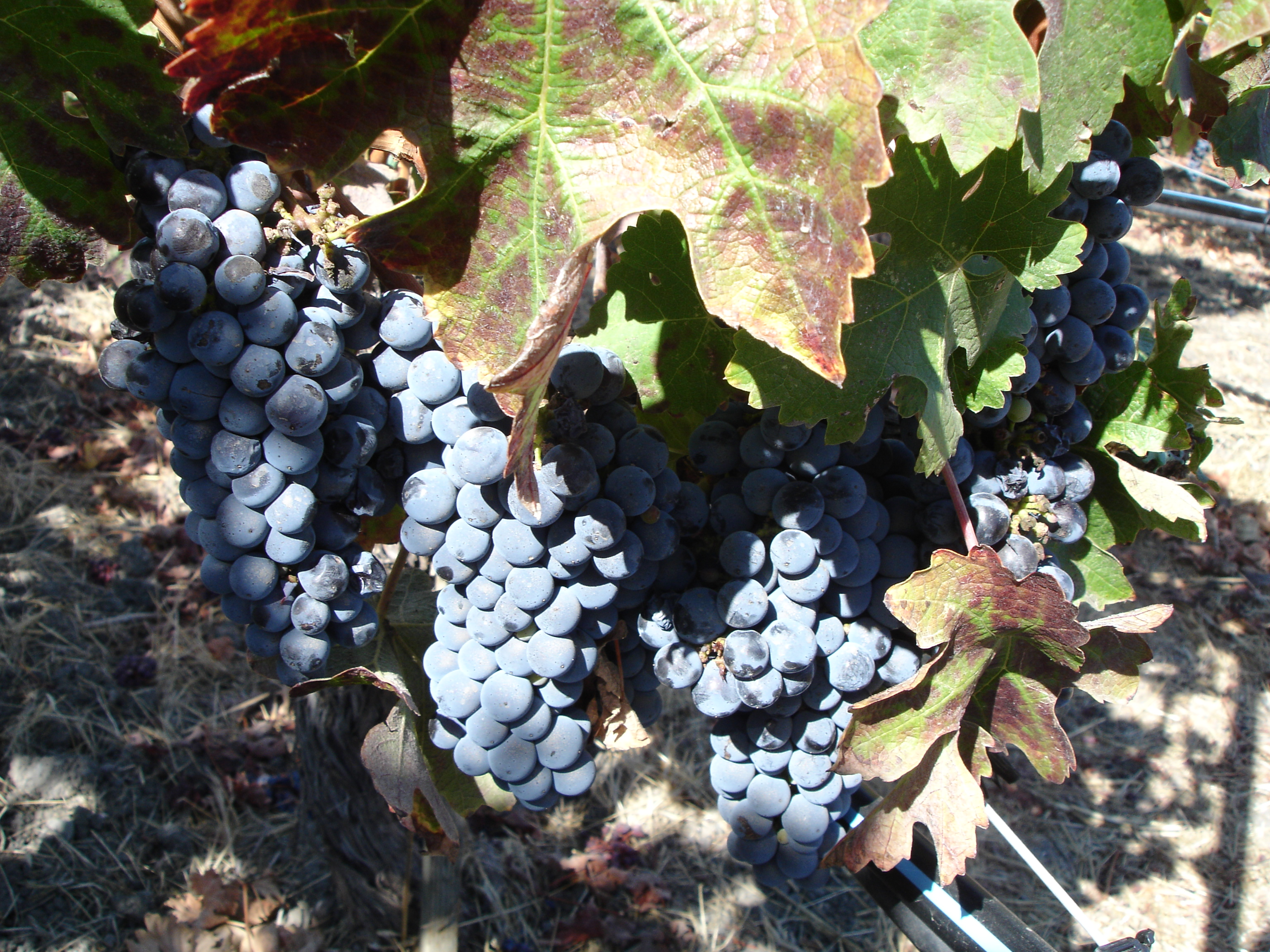
Cabernet Sauvignon

Léoville Barton's 116 acres (47 ha) vineyard is located in the central part of the appellation along the Gironde river. The soil composition is mostly gravel with a subsoil of clay. The plantings are 72% Cabernet Sauvignon, 20% Merlot, and 8% Cabernet Franc with the vines averaging 30 years of age.

== Wine ==
Two red wines are produced from the vineyards of Château Léoville Barton, an eponymous grand-vin, and a second wine called La Reserve de Léoville Barton which is produced from lots consisting of younger vines or lots deemed lacking the quality of the grand-vin. After a hand-picked harvest, fermentation takes place in temperature-controlled wood vats for two to three weeks before being transferred into oak barrels (50% of which are new) for aging before bottling.

== Green Spot Irish Whiskey ==
In June 2015, the Château partnered with Irish Distillers Midleton Distillery and Dublin-based Wine and Whiskey Merchants Mitchell and Son to create a Bordeaux wine finished expression of the iconic Green Spot Single Pot Still Irish Whiskey.
