= Château Ksara =

Winery in Lebanon

Coordinates: 33°49′34″N 35°53′31″E

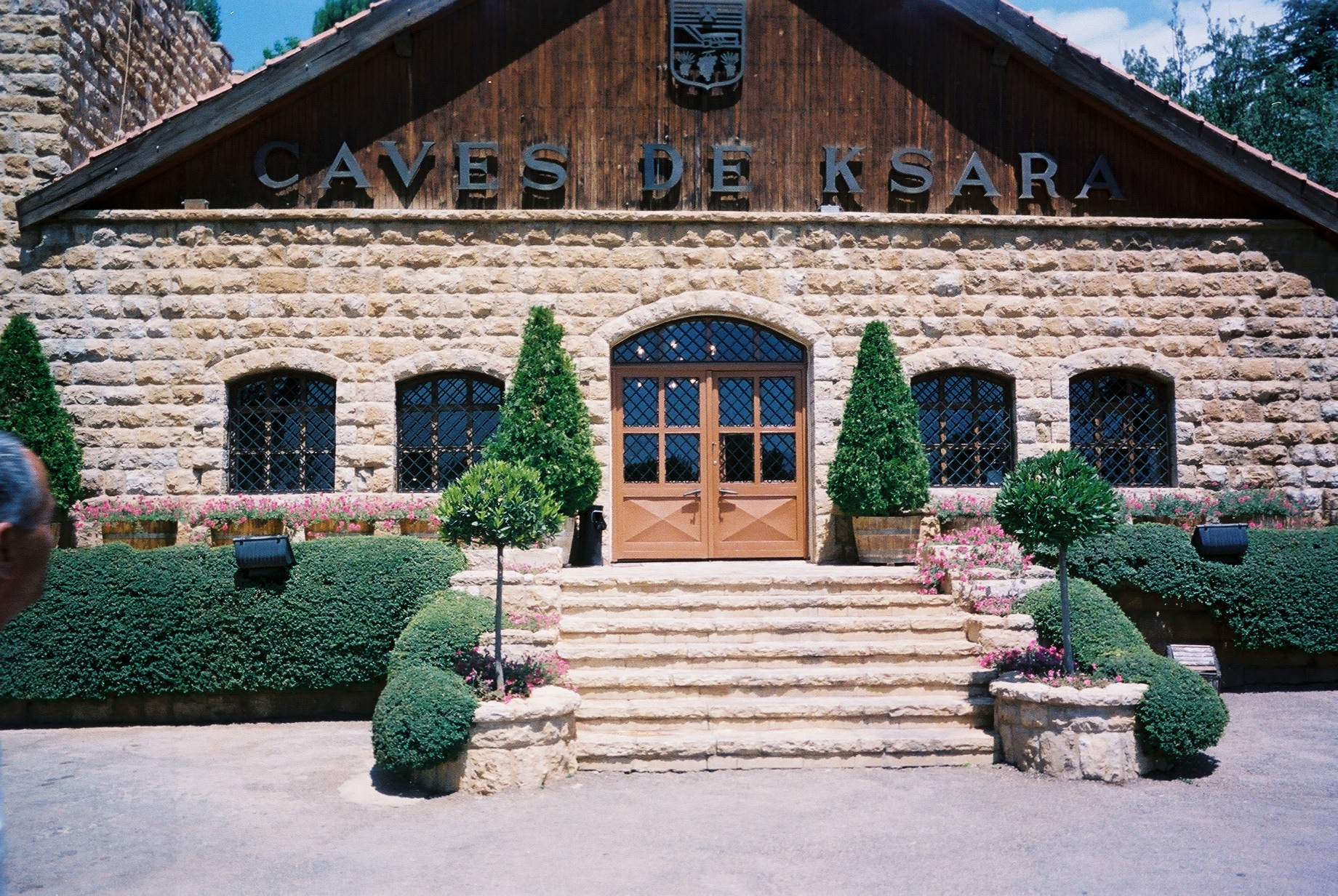
- The wine making headquarters of Château Ksara, in Bekaa, Lebanon
- Location: Bekaa Valley, Lebanon
- Appellation: Château Ksara
- Formerly: Ksara
- Founded: 1857
- Distribution: National and International
- Tasting: Open to public
- Website: http://www.ksara.com.lb

Château Ksara is a winery in Beqaa Valley of Lebanon. it is located in the town of Ksara near Zahle. It was founded in 1857 by Jesuit priests.

Château Ksara wine is most popular in Lebanon, but due to a large Lebanese diaspora all over the world, it can be found and purchased in many countries. Château Ksara produces approximately 3 million bottles annually. Its wines are exported to over 40 countries. Main export markets include Europe, USA, Canada, Japan, Hong Kong, Singapore, Brazil, Africa, Australia and Arab Countries.

== The story ==
Château Ksara was founded in 1857 by Jesuit Priests.

In 1898, a milestone was reached in Ksara's history when a grotto - an artificial cave - dating back to the Roman era was fortuitously discovered at the site. The caves - which now run for two kilometers - form part of Ksara's cellar network today.

In 1972, the Vatican encouraged its monasteries to sell off commercial assets, and Ksara was bought out by a local consortium of businessmen. The company continued production during the Lebanese civil war years. In 1991, a new management instigated several innovations such as changes in the company human resources, communication practices, new grapes varieties, and surface extension. In the following years, Ksara management innovated in production practices, bought new equipment, invested in new labels and packaging, then launched a marketing communication campaign to revamp the aged-image of their brand. To protect its intellectual property rights, the company filed a Community Trademark for Chateau Ksara SAL (in class 33) at the Office for Harmonization in the Internal Market (OHIM) in 2003.

Château Ksara is Lebanon's oldest, largest and most visited winery, attracting some 70,000 visitors per year, mainly from Lebanon but also from other countries including France, Germany and the United Kingdom (UK).

In 2010 Lebanese wine-producers exported around 2.5 million bottles of wine, a 13 percent annual increase, and Ksara was responsible for 33 percent of the output. The Reserve du Couvent accounted for 27 percent of all Ksara's international sales. As of 2010, Ksara produced 2.7 million bottles of wine per year, harvesting over two thousand eight hundred tons of grapes from three hundred forty hectares.

== Vineyards ==
All of Château Ksara’s vineyards are located in the central and western Bekaa Valley: Ksara Estate, Tanail, Mansoura, Tal el Der, Tal Dnoub, and Kanafar. At an average altitude of 1,000 meters, the Bekaa enjoys dry summers and has a water table fed by the melting snow of the Lebanon and Anti-Lebanon mountain ranges.

== Products ==
=== Red wines ===
- Le Souverain
- Le Prieuré
- Réserve du Couvent
- Cuvée De Printemps
- Cuvée IIIème Millénaire
- Château Ksara
- Cabernet Sauvignon
- Carignan

=== Rose wines ===
- Sunset
- Gris de Gris
- Rosé de Ksara
- Nuance

=== White wines ===
- Chardonnay
- Blanc de Blancs
- Blanc de L'Observatoire
- Merwah

=== Sweet fortified wines ===
- Moscatel

=== Arak ===
- Ksarak

=== Eau-de-vie ===
- Vieille Eau-de-Vie

== Awards ==
Ksara wine has been featured at wine tasting competitions all over the world.

2013: Berliner Wein Trophy 2013 (Berlin Gold) Château Ksara Red 2010
2013: Berliner Wein Trophy 2013 (Berlin Gold) Reserve du Couvent 2011
2013: Vinalies d'Argent Château Ksara Chardonnay 2012
2013: Vinalies d'Argent Château Ksara Le Prieuré Rouge 2011
2013: Vinalies d'Or Château Ksara Reserve du Couvent Rouge 2011
2013: Vinalies d'Argent Château Ksara Le Souverain Cent Cinquantenaire 1857-2007 Rouge 2009
2012: The Pan Arab Web Awards Academy awarded Château Ksara’s official website www.ksara.com.lb the Golden Award for 2012 out of 450 companies for the beverage category.
2012: Silver Medal for Réserve du Couvent 2010 in 2012 X Concurso International de Vinos - Spain
2012: Commended for Réserve du Couvent 2010 in 2012 International Wine Challenge
2012: Silver Medal for Le Prieuré, 2010 in 2012 International Wine Challenge
2010-2011: Lebanese Excellence Award
2004: Two gold medals at the Vinalies Internationales Paris in France

== See also ==
- List of Jesuit sites
