= Maurice Crosbie (priest) =

Maurice Crosbie, D.D. (27 November 1733 – 28 June 1809) was an Anglican priest in Ireland at the end of 18th and the beginning of the 19th-centuries.

The son of Maurice Crosbie, 1st Baron Brandon, he was educated at Trinity College, Dublin. Crosbie was Rector of Castleisland, then Dean of Limerick from 1771 until his death.
