= Robert Barton (British Army officer) =

British Army general (1768–1853)

General Sir Robert Barton KCH
- Born: 31 July 1768; Fethard, County Tipperary, Ireland
- Died: 17 March 1853 (aged 84); London, England
- Military career
- Allegiance: United Kingdom of Great Britain and Ireland
- Branch: British Army
- Rank: General
- Units: 11th Light Dragoons; 2nd Life Guards
- Conflicts: French Revolutionary Wars; Anglo-Russian invasion of Holland; Napoleonic Wars; Peninsular War
- Awards: Knighthood

General Sir Robert Johnstone Barton, KCH (31 July 1768 – 17 March 1853) was an Anglo-Irish officer of the British Army. He saw service during the French Revolutionary and Napoleonic Wars, particularly during the Anglo-Russian invasion of Holland in 1799 and the Peninsular War.

== Early life ==
Barton was the fifth son of William Barton of the Grove, County Tipperary, Ireland, and Grace Massy, daughter of Charles Massy, Dean of Limerick. Being in the south of France in 1790, he, like other British there, enrolled himself as a volunteer in the national guard, and received the thanks of the National Convention for his conduct at Moissac during the disorders at Montauban. He was the younger brother of Lieutenant-General Charles Barton and Thomas Barton, M.P.

== Army career ==
Having returned to England he obtained a commission in the 11th Light Dragoons, with which he served under the Duke of York in 1795, and again during the Anglo-Russian invasion of Holland in 1799, where he received the thanks of Sir Ralph Abercromby for his services on 8 September at Oude Carspel. Barton used his money to support boxers from Ireland although he was a supporter of Britain. He became lieutenant-colonel in the 2nd Life Guards in 1805, and commanded the regiment at the time of the Burdett riots in 1810, when the life guards acquired so much unpopularity. He also commanded the two squadrons of the regiment subsequently sent to the Iberian peninsula during the Peninsular War, where he served for a time. He was promoted to general's rank in 1819, and was appointed a Knight Commander of the Royal Guelphic Order and Knight Bachelor in 1837.

== Personal life ==
Barton married firstly to Maria Painter, daughter of John Painter. They had a son, Hugh, and two daughters, Grace and Maria. He married secondly to Marianne Colette Addison, widow of Colonel John MacPherson of Pitmain, great-granddaughter of Archbishop Smith, and had a third daughter, Alexandrina Charlotte, who married Sir Henry Josias Durrant, 4th Baronet.

He died in London on 17 March 1853.
