= Charles Barton (British Army officer) =

Anglo-Irish soldier (1760–1819)

Lieutenant-General Charles Barton
- Born: 20 April 1760; Waterford
- Died: June 11, 1819 (aged 59); Dublin
- Military career
- Allegiance: United Kingdom
- Branch: British Army
- Service years: 1779–1818
- Rank: Lieutenant-General
- Commands: 2nd Life Guards
- Conflicts: American Revolutionary War; French Revolutionary Wars; Napoleonic Wars; Peninsular War

Lieutenant-General Charles Barton (20 April 1760 – 11 June 1819) was an Anglo-Irish soldier who commanded the 2nd Regiment of Life Guards and fought in the Peninsular War.

Barton owned an estate in County Fermanagh, Ireland.

== Life ==
Born in 1760, Barton was the third son of William Barton (1723–1792), of Grove House, Fethard, County Tipperary, by his marriage to Grace Massy, a daughter of Charles Massy, Dean of Limerick. He was baptized into the Church of Ireland on 25 April 1760 at St Peter's, Aungier Street, Dublin. His brothers included Thomas Barton (1757–1820) and General Sir Robert Barton (1768–1853).

In February 1790, Barton was a Captain in the 2nd Regiment of Life Guards and was promoted to Supernumerary Major. In 1792, he was promoted to Major, and in December 1796, still serving in the 2nd Life Guards, from Lieutenant-Colonel to Major-General. In 1805 he again became Lieutenant-Colonel of the 2nd Life Guards by purchase, by which he gained command of the regiment. He was still its Lieutenant-Colonel in 1811, while it was fighting in the Peninsular War. During that war, on 25 April 1808, Barton was promoted to the rank of Lieutenant-General and was still a serving officer when he died in 1819 at the age of 59.

In 1804, while a Major-General, Barton sat with Henry Edward Fox as a member of a court martial to try a case against Dr Robert Gordon, Physician to the Forces.

In 1816, while Barton was living at 1, Montague Place, Mayfair, a man was hanged for breaking into his house and stealing a pistol.

At the time of his death, Barton owned an estate in County Fermanagh called the Waterfoot, near Pettigo, which was inherited by his eldest son.

Thomas Carlyle later described Barton as "...an Irish landlord and a man of connections about Court, lived in a certain figure here in Town; had a wife of fashionable habits, with other sons, and also daughters, bred in this sphere. These, all of them, were amiable, elegant, and pleasant people."

== Private life ==
In November 1799, at Wimbledon, Barton married Susannah Johnston, a daughter of Nathaniel Johnston, then of Wimbledon, and Susanna Gledstanes, and their first child, Hugh William Barton, who eventually followed in his father's footsteps by becoming Lieutenant-Colonel of the 2nd Life Guards, was born on 13 December 1800. They had at least six other children: Nathaniel Dunbar Barton (1803, later a Lieutenant-Colonel in the Bengal Cavalry); Thomas Charles Barton (1805–1856); Robert Johnston Barton (1809–1863); Albert Evelyn Barton (1812–1874); Susannah Barton (born c. 1813); and Anna Eleanor Barton (born c. 1816).

In her youth, Barton's wife had lived at Bordeaux in France, where her father, a Scot, had been naturalized as French. Barton met her as the result of his younger brother Hugh Barton becoming a merchant in Bordeaux, where he made a large fortune and in 1791 married Susannah's sister Anne Johnston. Hugh Barton owned Château Langoa-Barton and estates in Ireland and lived at Battle Abbey, Sussex. He was High Sheriff of County Kildare in 1840.

On 2 November 1830, at Christ Church, Marylebone, Barton's daughter Susannah married John Sterling, an author. Thomas Carlyle said of them that "His blooming, kindly and true-hearted Wife had not much money, nor had he as yet any..."

In 1831, at Karnal, British India, Barton’s son Nathaniel married Honoria Angelina, a daughter of Colonel Alexander Lawrence and sister of Henry Montgomery Lawrence.

Barton's other daughter, Anna Eleanor, married Frederick Denison Maurice, a clergyman, on 7 October 1837 at Clifton, and was the mother of two sons, including Major-General Sir Frederick Maurice.

== Australian descendants ==
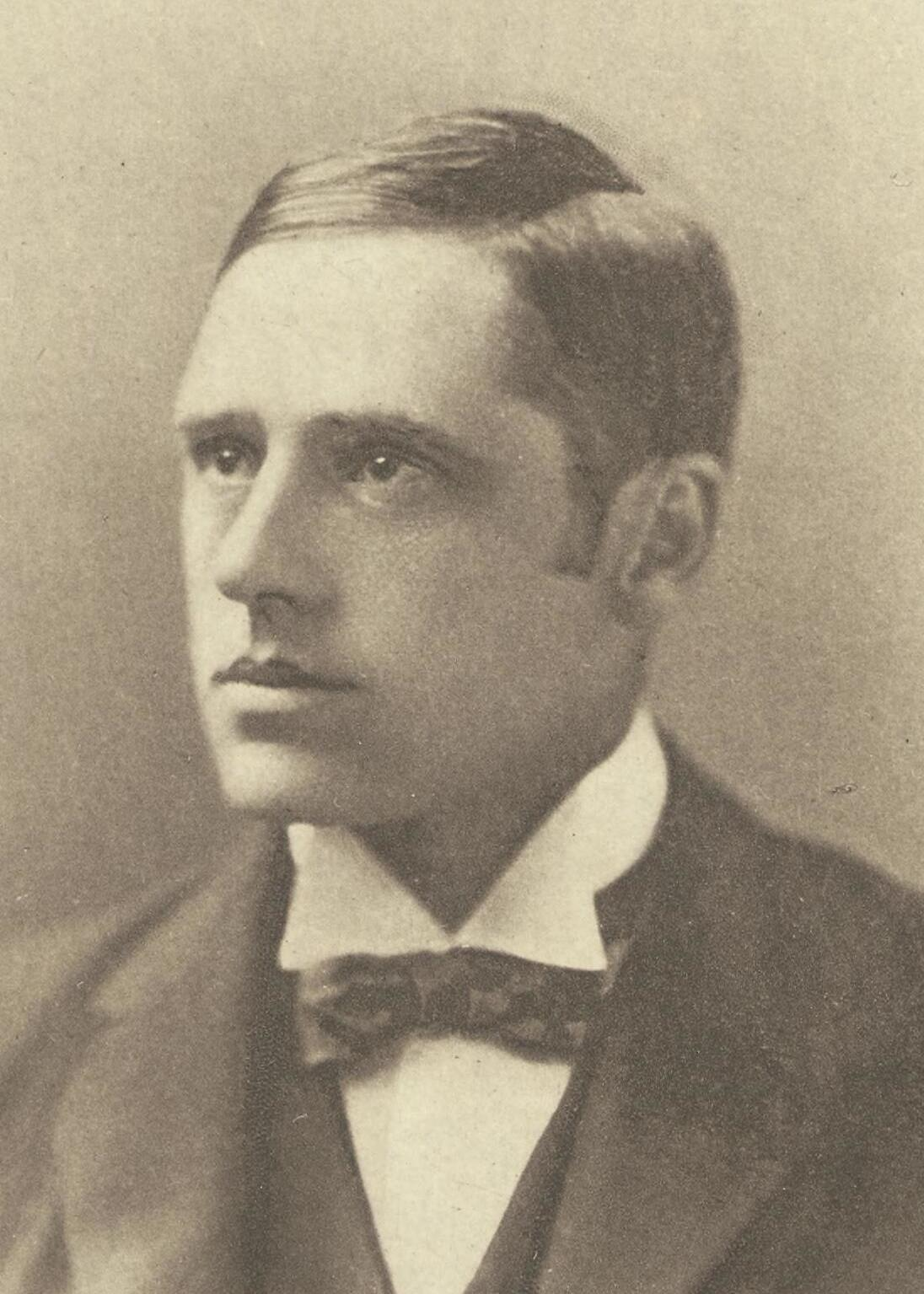
"Banjo" Paterson

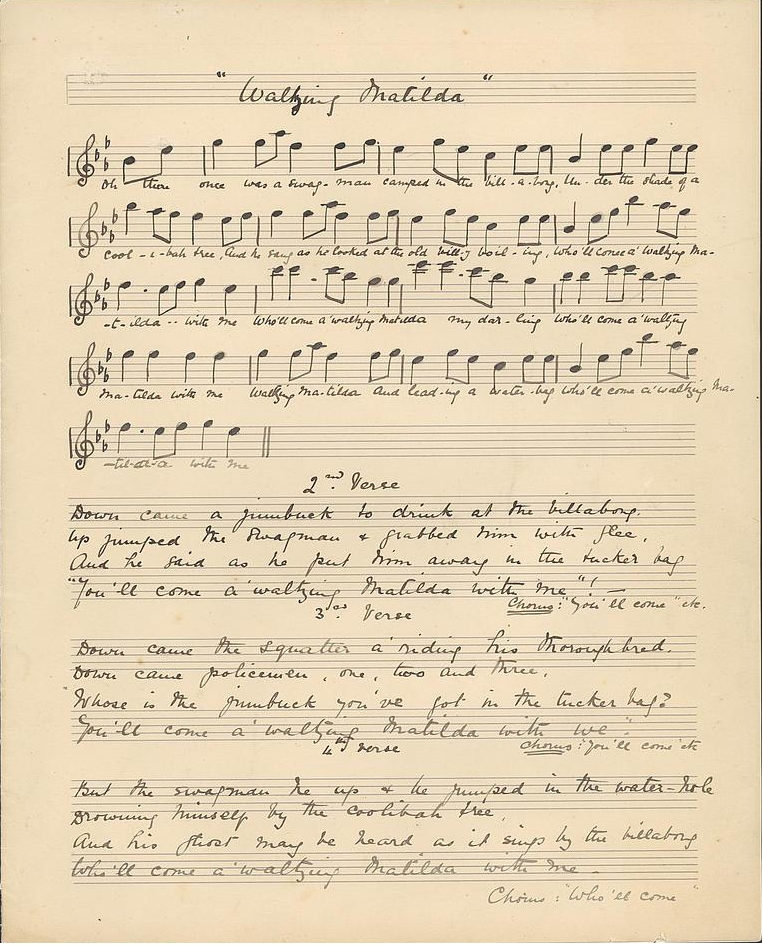
Waltzing Matilda MS

After an early career as a naval officer in the service of the East India Company, in 1840 Barton's son Robert Johnston Barton migrated to New South Wales and became a landowner and grazier at Boree Nyrang, near Molong. He married Emily Mary Darvall (1817–1909), a sister of John Darvall, and their daughter Rose Isabella Barton (1844–1893) married Andrew Paterson and was the mother of Andrew Barton Paterson (1864–1941), known as "Banjo", a prolific poet and the writer of the lyrics of Waltzing Matilda. The Dictionary of Australian Biography states that Paterson was related to Edmund Barton, the country’s first prime minister, but the exact relationship is unclear.
