= Embley =

Embley may refer to:

Persons

- Andrew Embley (born 1981), an Australian rules football player
- Edward Henry Embley (1861–1924), an Australian physician
- Mike Embley (born 1955), an English presenter on BBC World News

Places

- Embley, Hampshire, a place in Hampshire, England
- Embley, Northumberland, a place near Devil's Water river in Northumberland, England
- Embley Park, a park near Romsey, Hampshire, England
  - Embley (school), an independent school located in Embley Park
- Embley River, a river in Far North Queensland, Australia
