= Charles Hallaran =

Royal Navy officer and rugby player (1897–1941)

Charles Hallaran AM
- Full name: Charles Francis George Thomas Hallaran
- Born: 10 June 1897 Ceylon
- Died: 21 March 1941 (aged 43) at sea
- Notable relative(s): Thomas Hallaran (grandfather); William Hallaran (father)
- Occupation: Royal Navy officer

Rugby union career
- Position: Second row
International career
Years	Team	Apps	(Points)
1921–26	Ireland	15	(0)

Commander Charles Francis George Thomas Hallaran (10 June 1897 — 21 March 1941) was a Royal Navy officer and Ireland international rugby union player.

== Biography ==
Born in Ceylon, Hallaran was the grandson of Thomas Hallaran, an Archdeacon of Ardfert, and the son of Ireland international halfback William Hallaran, later a surgeon in the Royal Army Medical Corps.

Hallaran, a second row forward, gained 15 Ireland caps between 1921 and 1926. He also played at various times for the Barbarians, Edinburgh Wanderers, Lansdowne, Surrey, Royal Navy and United Services. A capable boxer, Hallaran was officers' heavyweight champion of both the Grand Fleet and Royal Navy.

In World War I Hallaran served as a sub lieutenant on HMS Zinnia and lieutenant on HMS Resolution.

Hallaran had attained the rank of commander on the retired list by World War II and was serving on HMS Springbank in 1941 when he drowned rescuing a stoker who had fallen overboard. After guiding the sailor to safety, Hallaran was taken by a wave and suffered a fractured skull, having been crushed between two vessels. He was posthumously awarded the Albert Medal for gallantry.

== See also ==
- List of Ireland national rugby union players
