= Rosalind Nash =

English journalist and co-operator (1862–1952)

- Born: Rosalind Frances Mary Shore Smith; December 1862; Kensington, London, England
- Died: 17 October 1952 (aged 89); Hampshire, England
- Burial place: St Margaret of Antioch, Wellow, Hampshire, England
- Education: Girton College, Cambridge, (1881–4)
- Occupations: Journalist, co-operator
- Organization: Women's Co-operative Guild
- Spouse: Vaughan Nash
- Relatives: Barbara Stephen (sister); Florence Nightingale (father's cousin)

Rosalind Frances Nash, née Shore-Smith (December 1862 – 17 October 1952) was an English journalist and co-operator. She was the niece and confidante of Florence Nightingale.

== Biography ==
Rosalind Shore-Smith was born into a landowning family in Kensington, London, in December 1862. She was the elder daughter of Florence Nightingale's cousin William Shore Smith (afterwards Shore Nightingale), whom Florence Nightingale "regarded almost as a brother". Rosalind's father in 1874 inherited the bulk of the estate of William Nightingale, Florence's father.

She was educated at Girton College, Cambridge, where she became close friends with Margaret Llewelyn Davies.

Barbara (nee Margaret Thyra Barbara Shore-Smith), Rosalind's sister, married barrister and Judge of the Calcutta High Court Sir Harry Lushington Stephen. In 1893, Nash married the progressive economist Vaughan Nash (1861–1932) and they lived at Loughton in Essex.

Nash was a member of the Co-operative Women's Guild, which she referred to as "a kind of trade union" for housewives during a paper "The Position of Married Women," presented at the Guild Congress in 1907. She was also a suffragist, supporting the campaign for women's enfranchisement.

Nash worked as a journalist, primarily writing about women's suffrage and labour issues such as the conditions of dangerous trades. She assisted in some of Nightingale's publications, and wrote on her behalf to Karl Pearson while he was writing his biography of Francis Galton. After Florence Nightingale's death, her husband Vaughan Nash played an important role in collating and copying her correspondence.

Nash died in 1952. She was buried with her husband, who had predeceased her by twenty years, in the graveyard in the parish church of St Margaret of Antioch]], Wellow, Hampshire.

== Works ==
- The accidents compensation act 1897, 1897
- Life and death in the potteries, 1898
- A Sketch of the Life of Florence Nightingale
- Rosalind Nash (1907). "Co-operator and Citizen". The Case for Women's Suffrage: 66–77. Wikidata Q107166752.
- (ed. with preface), Florence Nightingale's To Her Nurses. A Selection from her addresses to probationers and nurses of the Nightingale School at St.Thomas's Hospital. London, Macmillan, 1914
- (ed. with Sir Edward Tyas Cook, The Life of Florence Nightingale, Macmillan and Co, London, 1925. (An abridged version of Cook's 2-volume The Life of Florence Nightingale, Macmillan and Co, London, 1913)
- Florence Nightingale according to Mr. Strachey, 1928
