= John Ducey (priest) =

Irish Anglican priest

John Ducey was an Irish Anglican priest in the 17th century: the Archdeacon of Ardfert from 1625 to 1628.

Church of Ireland titles
Preceded by Daniel Lysacht	Archdeacon of Ardfert; 1625–1628	Succeeded by Robert Gough
