= Wyse Jackson =

Wyse Jackson may refer to

- John Wyse Jackson, Irish author
- Patrick Wyse Jackson (born 1960), Irish geologist
- Peter Wyse Jackson (born 1955), Irish botanist
- Robert Wyse Jackson (1908–1976), Irish bishop and author
