= Michael Keating (priest) =

Irish Anglican priest (1793–1877)

Michael John Keatinge (1793–1877), also Keating, was a 19th-century Irish Anglican priest. He argued in 1827 that the economic problems of Ireland were largely caused by the system of letting land, with which government should not interfere.

== Life ==
Keatinge was educated at Trinity College, Dublin, graduating B.A. in 1814. In 1824 he was a school patron at Bruree, and at Cahirnarry, also in county Limerick. His expressed views on economics in Ireland have been characterised as "reductive Malthusian". At this time there were proponents in the Church of Ireland clergy of a Poor Law system. Keatinge belonged to the clerical opposition, as did George Hickey of County Wexford who in 1820 wrote as "Martin Doyle" on The State of the Poor of Ireland Considered and agricultural education, and George Miller of Derryvullan, who advocated laisser faire. Keatinge saw the solutions, to perceived overpopulation, in emigration, and "moral education".

By 1827 Keatinge was Rector of Ventry in county Kerry. He was Rector there to 1841.

Keatinge was Archdeacon of Ardfert from 1839 to 1856; and Dean of Kilfenora from then until 1877.

== Works ==
Keatinge was the author of two books published at Limerick, under variant names Michael I. Keating or Michael J. Keating:

- A letter to Wilmot Horton, Esq. M.P. on emigration from Ireland (1826), as Michael I. Keating, Secretary of the Limerick Emigrants' Friend Society
- A Letter to the Right Hon. Henry Goulburn on Grand Jury Laws and a legal provision for the Poor of Ireland (1827), was the second edition, Suggestions for a Revision of the Irish Grand Jury Laws having appeared in 1825.

Church of Ireland titles
Preceded by Edward Newenham Hoare	Archdeacon of Ardfert; 1839–1856	Succeeded by Arthur Blennerhassett Rowan
