= Thomas Hallaran =

Irish religious figure (1830–1915)

Thomas Tuckey Hallaran (1830 – 1915) was Archdeacon of Ardfert from 1915 to 1922.

The son of a Church of Ireland priest, Hallaran was educated at Trinity College, Dublin. He was the Incumbent at Cahir from 1867 until his death.

His son, William Hallaran, was an Irish rugby international.

Church of Ireland titles
Preceded by Raymond d’Audemar Orpen	Archdeacon of Ardfert; 1907–1915	Succeeded by William Malcolm Foley
