= Anthony Denny (priest) =

Irish priest (1807–1890)

Anthony Denny (1807 - 1890) was Archdeacon of Ardfert from 1861 to 1885.

The son of Sir Edward Denny, 3rd Baronet, M.P. for Tralee he was educated at Trinity College, Dublin. He was the Incumbent at Tralee from 1831 until 1861; and at Kilgobbin from 1862 until 1895.

Church of Ireland titles
Preceded by Arthur Blennerhassett Rowan	Archdeacon of Ardfert; 1861–1862	Succeeded by Raymond d’Audemar Orpen
