= Elizabeth Medal =

Elizabeth Medal may refer to:

- Elizabeth Medal of Honour, awarded to British non-horticulturalists and international horticultural and non-horticulturalists
- Elizabeth Cross, for next of kin of members of the British Armed Forces who have died on operations, or as a result of an act of terrorism

== See also ==
- Queen Elizabeth II Medal (disambiguation)
- Queen Elisabeth Medal, a Belgian award of World War I
