= Thomas Parsons (priest) =

Irish Anglican priest

Thomas Parsons was an Irish Anglican priest: the Archdeacon of Ardfert from 1641 to 1644.

Church of Ireland titles
| Preceded by Robert Gough | Archdeacon of Ardfert; 1641–1664 | Succeeded by John Smith |
