= Katharine Stephen =

British librarian

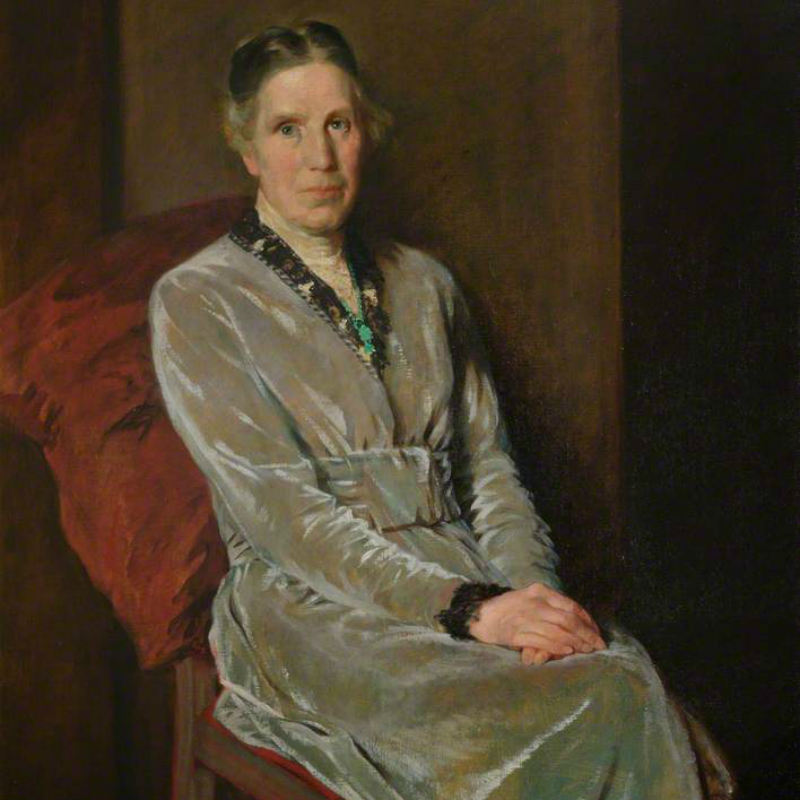
- Stephen by Glyn Philpot
- Born: 26 February 1856; South Kensington, London, England
- Died: 16 June 1924 (aged 68); South Kensington, England
- Other name: Sarah Brook
- Education: Bedford College
- Occupation: Librarian
- Known for: Principal of Newnham College

Katharine Stephen (26 February 1856 – 16 June 1924) was a British librarian and later principal of Newnham College at Cambridge University.

== Early life and family ==
Katharine Stephen was born in 1856 in London, the daughter of Sir James Fitzjames Stephen (1829–1894) and Mary Richenda Cunningham (1829–1912), daughter of Rev. John William Cunningham. Her siblings included Rosamond Stephen and Sir Harry Stephen. She was the niece of Caroline Stephen and of Leslie Stephen and the cousin of Virginia Woolf and Vanessa Bell.

== Work ==
Katharine Stephen worked at Newnham College, Cambridge. She first joined the college as Helen Gladstone's secretary, and worked with Anne Jemima Clough to teach working men on Sunday mornings in St Matthew's Schoolroom, Barnwell. She was appointed Librarian of Newnham's 'first purpose-built library' in 1888. She went on to become Vice-Principal and, in 1911, Principal of the college during the First World War years, and kept her seat on the Council after her retirement in 1920.

Stephen sat for a portrait by her cousin Vanessa Bell but that painting is lost. The painting at Newnham College is by Glyn Philpot.

Stephen died of cancer on 16 June 1924 at her home in South Kensington. She was loyal to her family; every day she would either see her mother or write her a letter. Her aunt, Caroline Stephen, was another relative; she was a Quaker as well. Caroline came to live in Cambridge in 1895, where she evangelised to Newnham students. Caroline's final book contained a short memoir written by Katherine.

== Legacy ==
The Katharine Stephen Rare Books Library at Newnham was built in 1981-82. It was designed by Joanna van Heyningen and was listed Grade II in 2018 with other post-modern buildings.

== Publications ==
- French History for English Children (1881), under the pseudonym Sarah Brook.
- Three Sixteenth Century Sketches (1884), under the pseudonym Sarah Brook.

Academic offices
Preceded by Eleanor Mildred Sidgwick	Principal of Newnham College, Cambridge; 1911–1920	Succeeded by Blanche Athena Clough
