= Edward Hoare (priest) =

Irish Anglican Priest

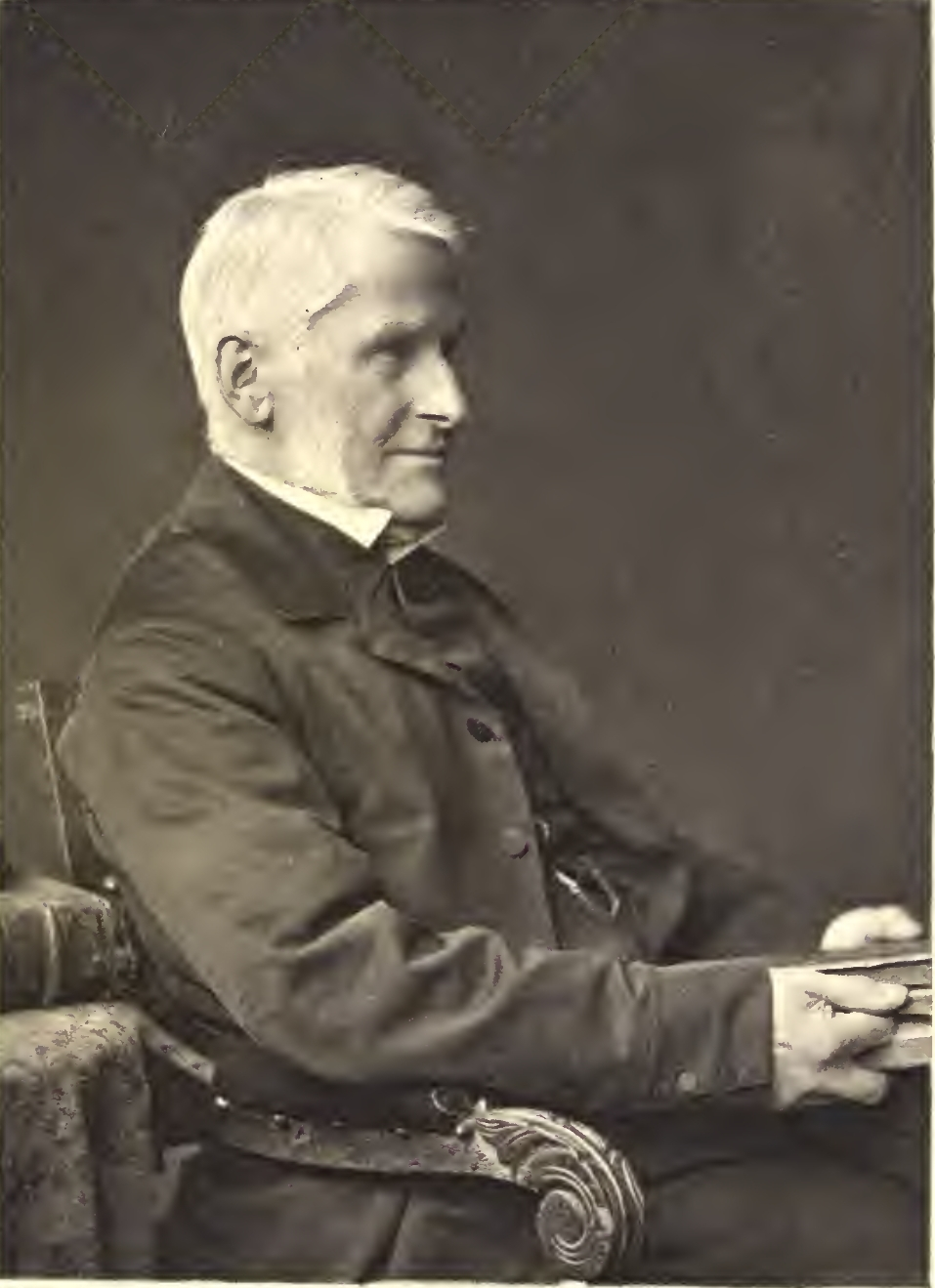
Edward Hoare in His Later Years

Edward Newenham Hoare (11 April 1802 – 1 February 1877), a graduate of Trinity College, Dublin was an Irish Anglican priest: he was Archdeacon of Ardfert from 1836 to 1839, then Dean of Achonry from 1839 to 1850; and Dean of Waterford from then until his death.

== Life ==
He was the son of the Rev. John Hoare of Drishane and Rathkeale, and his wife Rachel Newenham, daughter of Edward Newenham, born in Limerick. As a recent graduate (1824) of Trinity College, Dublin, he was a curate in 1825 at Parwich and Alsop en le Dale in Derbyshire. In 1827 he was in Edgeworthstown, County Longford.

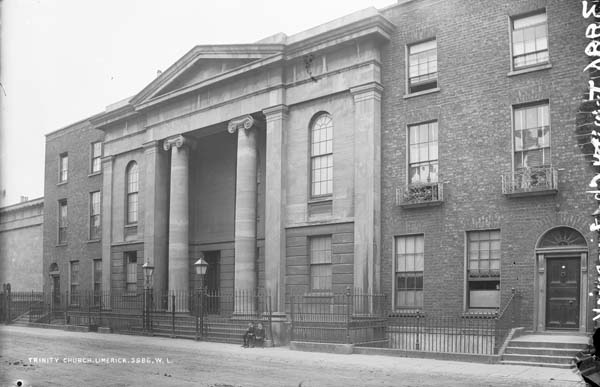
Trinity Church, Limerick, built 1834 with funds raised by Edward Newenham Hoare

Around 1830, Hoare was curate at St. John's, Limerick. He raised funds in England and Scotland, in 1834, to erect a church for the parish of St. Lawrence, allowing for the wishes of Edmund Pery, 1st Earl of Limerick, which meant that the church would be a chapel, attached to a charity, in this case an Asylum for Blind Females. The chapel was built that year, to a design by Joseph Fogarty.

Hoare was made Rector of St Lawrence, Limerick in 1835, and Archdeacon of Ardfert in 1836. He became a chaplain in 1839 to Hugh Fortescue, 2nd Earl Fortescue, the Lord Lieutenant of Ireland.

The House of Lords committee on Richard Whately's Irish national education system heard evidence from Hoare. In 1865 he joined the Church Association. He was a vice-president of the National Education League for Ireland.

Hoare died in Upper Norwood, Surrey on 1 February 1877.

== The Christian Herald ==
Hoare was noted as an evangelical preacher, and edited The Christian Herald, a prophetical journal that appeared from 1830 to 1835, and was published in Dublin. Its editorial line was historicist and premillennialist. It reported in detail on the first two prophetic conferences at Powerscourt House, and ran some articles by John Nelson Darby. A sequel publication, under the same title, was later started by Michael Paget Baxter.

The attitude of The Christian Herald to eschatology had something in common with other periodicals, Churchman's Monthly Review, and The Quarterly Journal of Prophecy, and the views of Thomas Nolan (1809–1882). The central idea was that the personal reign of Christ would be prolonged indefinitely.

== Works ==
Hoare wrote numerous sermons; and other works including:

- Practical Observations on Church Reform, the Tithe Question and National Education in Ireland (1838)
- The Tendency of the Principles advocated in the Tracts for the Times considered (1841). In this work on the Tracts for the Times, cast as advice to a candidate for ordination, Hoare advised against emphasis on the antiquity of the Irish church, as an argument easily subverted to Catholic ends.
- The Time of the End; or, The World, The Visible Church, and the People of God, at the Advent of the Lord. (1846)
- The Duty and Expediency on the Part of the Landed Proprietors of Ireland, of Co-operating with the Board of National Education; Considered in a Letter to a Deputy-Lieutenant of the Co. Sligo (1847)
- The English Settler's Guide Through Irish Difficulties; Or, a Hand-book for Ireland, with Reference to Present and Future Prospects (1850)
- Remarks on certain mis-statements as to the extent of scriptural education in Ireland, previous to the establishment of the National System (1850). Hoare was questioned in 1864 about the effect of the National Education System in Ireland, in particular on the financing of the Kildare Place Society, by a House of Lords committee.
- English Roots, and the Deviation of Words from the Ancient Anglo-Saxon, two lectures (1856)
- Exotics: Or, English Words Derived from Latin Roots: Ten Lectures (1863)

== Family ==
Hoare married, first, in 1832, Louisa Mary O'Donoghue (died 1858); and secondly, in 1859, as her third husband, Harriet Wilson (née Cramp). He had by his first wife two sons, including Edward Newenham Hoare, rector of Acrise and writer of tracts (with whom as an author he is sometimes confused), and three daughters. There were no children of the second marriage, but Hoare became stepfather to Emma Harriet (née Wilson), 12th Baroness Berners. He and Henry William Wilson, 11th Baron Berners had in common an interest in the Church Association.

Church of Ireland titles
Preceded by Thomas Grace	Archdeacon of Ardfert; 1836–1839	Succeeded by Michael Keating
Preceded by Theophilus Blakely	Dean of Achonry; 1839–1850	Succeeded by Hervey de Montmorency
Preceded by Thomas Townsend	Dean of Waterford; 1850–1877	Succeeded by John Morgan
