= Nicholas Averie =

Nicholas Averie was an Irish Anglican priest in the late 16th and early 17th centuries:

Averie was Chancellor of Limerick Cathedral from 1591 to 1606; and Archdeacon of Ardfert from 1615 to 1621.
