= Robert Gough =

Robert Gough may refer to:

- Robert Gough (actor), English actor
- Robert Gough (priest), Irish Anglican priest
- Bobby Gough (born 1949), English footballer
