= Rosamond Stephen =

English lay missionary (1868–1951)

Rosamond Emily Stephen
- Born: 1868; Kensington, London, England
- Died: 4 February 1951 (aged 82–83)
- Occupations: Lay missionary, advocate of ecumenism
- Years active: 1903–1951 (as founder and active in the Irish Guild of Witness and its library)
- Era: 20th century
- Organization(s): Irish Guild of Witness; Representative Church Body (RCB) Library
- Known for: Co-founding the Irish Guild of Witness donating books that formed the basis of the RCB Library
- Movement: Ecumenism
- Parents: Sir James Fitzjames Stephen (father); Mary Richenda Cunningham (mother)
- Relatives: Katharine Stephen (sister); Sir Leslie Stephen (uncle); Virginia Woolf (cousin); John William Cunningham (grandfather)
- Family: Stephen family

Rosamond Emily Stephen (1868 – 4 February 1951), was an English-born lay missionary in the Church of Ireland in Belfast and advocate of ecumenism.

== Biography ==
Stephen was born in Kensington, London, in 1868, the daughter of Sir James Fitzjames Stephen (1829–1894) and Mary Richenda Cunningham (1829–1912), daughter of Rev. John William Cunningham. Her sister Katharine Stephen (1856–1924) was the principal of Newnham College, Cambridge. Rosamond Stephen's initial visits to Ireland were holidays in County Kerry and County Louth.

In 1903, along with Rev. Raymond Orpen, Stephen founded the Guild of Witness (later called the Irish Guild of Witness), to promote the Irish dimension of the Church of Ireland and in 1918 created the Irish Guild of Witness Library In 1921, Stephen moved to Dublin, living in Ardfeenish, 21 Mount Street, bringing with her books from the Irish Guild of Witness, it became the Ardfeenish Library.

In 1931, she donated some 5,000 books on the Bible and theology, from the Irish Guild of Witness, to the church, and in 1932, the Representative Church Body (RCB) Library was established in St. Stpehen's Green, Dublin. She later added some 10000 volumes from her father Sir James Fitzjames Stephen and her grandfather Sir James Stephen a former professor of modern history at Cambridge. In 1969, the Library was moved to the site of the Divinity Hostel (now the Church of Ireland Theological Institute) in Churchtown. Over the years, the RCB Library became the central repository for local (parish) and national Church of Ireland documents.

She was a cousin of the writer Virginia Woolf through her father's brother Sir Leslie Stephen.
