= Atherley =

Atherley may refer to:

- Atherley, Ontario, a former township of Ontario, Canada
- Arthur Atherley (1772–1844), English Member of Parliament, serving the Southampton constituency
- The Atherley School, a former all girls independent school based in Southampton
- Llewellyn Atherley-Jones (1851–1929), a British politician and barrister
