= Arthur Rowan =

Irish antiquary and writer

Arthur Blennerhassett Rowan, (1800–1861) was a Church of Ireland cleric, Archdeacon of Ardfert from 1856 to 1861, known also as an antiquarian writer.

== Life ==
Rowan born in county Kerry, probably in Tralee, the son of William Rowan, Provost of Tralee, and his wife Letitia Denny, daughter of Sir Barry Denny, 1st Baronet of Tralee Castle and a cousin. He was educated at Dr. King's school, Ennis, and at the age of sixteen entered Trinity College, Dublin.

Graduating B.A. in 1821, M.A. 1827, B.D. and D.D. 1854, Rowan was ordained in 1824, and received the curacy of Blennerville in county Kerry; he held it for 30 years, some of that time with Ballynahaglish. He set up and edited the Kerry Magazine, which ran for two or three years, and mainly dealt with local history and antiquities.

In 1854 Rowan was appointed rector of Kilgobbin, Clonfert, and on 31 March 1856 was promoted archdeacon of Ardfert. He died at Belmont, near Tralee, 12 August 1861, and was buried in Ballyseedy churchyard.

== Works ==
Rowan's published works included:

- Spare Minutes of a Minister, poems (anon.), 1837.
- Letters from Oxford, by Ignotus (pseudonym), Dublin, 1843, dating from a visit in 1840 to Oxford, and commenting on the Tractarians.
- Romanism in the Church, illustrated by the case of the Rev. E. G. Browne, London, 1847.
- Newman's Popular Fallacies considered, in six letters, with introduction and notes from The Spectator, Dublin, 1852.
- Lake Lore, or an Antiquarian Guide to some of the Ruins and Recollections of Killarney, Dublin, 1853.
- First Fruits of an Early Gathered Harvest, edited by A. B. R., 1854.
- Casuistry and Conscience, two discourses, 8vo, Dublin.
- Gleanings after Grand Tourists (anon.), 1856, from a European tour in 1849.
- Brief Memorials of the Case and Conduct of T. C. D., A.D. 1686–1690, compiled from the College Records, Dublin, 1858.
- Life of the Blessed Franco, extracted and englished from a verie anciente Chronicle, London, 1858.
- The Old Countess of Desmond, her identitie, her portraiture, her descente, 1860.

== Family ==
Rowan married Alicia, daughter of Peter Thompson. They had two sons, William, later of Belmont, county Kerry, and Arthur Edward Denny, and two daughters, including writer and historian, Anne Margaret and Ora.

Church of Ireland titles
Preceded by Michael Keating	Archdeacon of Ardfert; 1856–1861	Succeeded by Anthony Denny
