= Barbara, Lady Stephen =

English educational writer (1872–1945)

Lady Barbara Stephen
- Born: Margaret Thyra Barbara Shore Smith; 6 February 1872; London, England
- Died: 24 March 1945 (aged 73); Hale, Hampshire, England
- Other name: Barbara Shore Nightingale
- Education: Roedean School
- Alma mater: Girton College, Cambridge
- Occupation: Educationist
- Notable work: Emily Davies and Girton College (1927)
- Spouse: Harry Lushington Stephen (m. 1904)
- Parent(s): William Shore Smith; Louisa Eleanor Hutchins
- Relatives: Florence Nightingale (cousin); Rosalind Nash (sister)

Barbara, Lady Stephen (née Shore Smith, afterwards Shore Nightingale, 6 February 1872 – 1945) was an English educational writer and biographer.

== Family and education ==
Lady Stephen was born Margaret Thyra Barbara Shore Smith on 6 February 1872 at Park Place, London, England.

She was the fourth child and second daughter of William Shore Smith (1831–1894) and his wife Louisa Eleanor Shore Smith (née Hutchins). Her surname became Shore Nightingale after her father assumed the name Nightingale, of Embley, Hampshire, and Lea Hurst, Derbyshire in 1893.

Lady Stephen was named after her father's first cousin, the educationalist and feminist Barbara Bodichon. She was also the cousin of social reformer and founder of modern nursing Florence Nightingale. Florence Nightingale regarded her father as "almost as a brother."

Lady Stephen was educated privately at Heath Brow in Hampstead and Roedean School in Brighton, then studied history at Girton College, Cambridge, graduating in 1894. At Girton, she gained second in the historical tripos and was a member of the Cambridge University Music Society. Her sister Rosalind Nash, who became a journalist and co-operator, was also educated at Girton College.

== Marriage ==
Lady Stephen travelled to British India with her brother. On 24 December 1904 in Bombay, she married Harry Lushington Stephen, later Sir Harry Stephen (1860–1945), who was a high court judge in Calcutta.

== Career ==
Whilst living in India with her husband from 1904 to 1913, Lady Stephen co-founded the Women Graduates Union in Calcutta, with the barrister and social reformer Cornelia Sorabji, for the benefit of professional women coming to India. She was also a member of the European Female Orphan Asylum, served as secretary of the National Indian Association and learned the Hindustani and Persian languages.

After returning to England, Lady Stephen was a member of Girton College Council 1913–1932, Governor of Girton College 1913–1938, and a generous benefactor of Girton Library. She was also the biographer of Emily Davies, the campaigner for women's university access and founder of Girton College.

During the World War I, Lady Stephen sat on the Cambridgeshire War Pensions Committee.

== Death ==
Lady Stephen died on 24 March 1945 and her husband passed away a few months later.

== Works ==
- Emily Davies and Girton College, 1927.
- Girton College 1869-1932, Cambridge University Press, Cambridge, 1932. 167p.
