= Thomas Connor (priest) =

Irish Anglican priest

Thomas Connor was an Irish Anglican priest, ordained on 23 December 1668 he was Archdeacon of Ardfert from 1693 until 1704.
