= George Massy =

George Massy (1706–1782) was Archdeacon of Ardfert from 1772 until his death.

He was educated at Trinity College, Dublin. His uncle was Dean of Limerick from 1740 to 1766.

Church of Ireland titles
Preceded by Robert Cashin	Archdeacon of Ardfert; 1772–1782	Succeeded by Edward Day
