= Thomas Grace (Archdeacon of Ardfert) =

Thomas Grace (1770–1848) was Archdeacon of Ardfert from 1808 to 1836.

Grace was educated at Trinity College, Dublin. He held Incumbencies at Ballinvoher and Westport.

He died on 8 February 1848.

Church of Ireland titles
Preceded by Edward Day	Archdeacon of Ardfert; 1808–1836	Succeeded by Edward Newenham Hoare
