= Thomas Bunbury (bishop) =

Irish Anglican bishop

The Rt Revd Thomas Bunbury DD

Bishop of Limerick, Ardfert and Aghadoe
- In office 1899–1907

Personal details
- Born: 1830
- Died: 1907 (aged 76–77)
- Education: Trinity College, Dublin

Thomas Bunbury (1830–1907) was an Irish cleric in the late 19th and early 20th centuries.

He was born in 1830 at Shandrum and educated at Trinity College, Dublin. Ordained in 1854 he was a curate at Clonfert and then Mallow before becoming the incumbent of Croom. He was Dean of Limerick from 1872 to 1899 when he became Bishop of Limerick, Ardfert and Aghadoe. He died in post on 19 January 1907.

Church of Ireland titles
Preceded by Charles Graves	Bishop of Limerick, Ardfert and Aghadoe; 1899 – 1907	Succeeded by Raymond d’Audemar Orpen
