= Anne Margaret Rowan =

- Born: 21 November 1832; Tralee, County Kerry, Ireland
- Died: 13 December 1913 (aged 81); Clonskeagh Castle, Dublin

Anne Margaret Rowan (21 November 1832 – 13 December 1913) was an Irish novelist, historian, and political activist.

== Life ==
Anne Margaret Rowan was born in Tralee, County Kerry on 21 November 1832. Her parents were Arthur Rowan and Alice (née Thompson), who were part of the Kerry gentry with Scottish heritage. Her maternal grandfather was the Kerry county treasurer, Peter Thompson (died 1849). She had two siblings who survived to adulthood, William and Ora. There are no records of Rowan's early life, but she was likely privately educated at home in Belmont, Tralee. She shared her father's interest in Irish history and archaeology.

Rowan undertook research for Mary Agnes Hickson, a fellow Kerry historian, for Hickson's book Ireland in the seventeenth century (1884) which saw Rowan travel to the Public Records Office, the British Museum, Lambeth Palace Library, and the Bodleian Library, Oxford. She also aided Alexander Balloch Grosart in his work The Lismore papers (1886), which may have sparked Rowan's interest in the history of Protestant settler families of Kerry. Rowan wrote and published widely, writing both history and fiction under her own name and the pen name Amos Reade. She was a regular contributor to the Kerry Evening Post writing about Kerry history. In 1894, Rowan joined the Society of Women Journalists very soon after its foundation.

She served as the honorary secretary of the Kerry branch of the Irish Unionist Alliance for 25 years, and campaigned continuously, particularly against home rule in Ireland in the 1890s. She was a member of the conservative unionist political association, the Primrose League, touring Britain and Ireland extensively in the early 1890s. Rowan also spoke as the secretary of Tralee's St Brendan's Habitation of the League. In her speeches in England she warned that Ireland could be used as a staging post for the invasion of Great Britain, and was a firm defender of Ireland remaining in the union, believing Ireland would fall into anarchy if Ireland was granted Home Rule. To Irish audiences she used more nuanced arguments, reminding them of the parity between the Irish, the Scots and the Welsh, and that Ireland would struggle without the Union.

In 1892 she organised a controversial lecture series to raise awareness of Tralee's labourers. She was elected to the board of poor law guardians for the Tralee union in 1897, and in this position she is credited with advances in the level and quality of medical care available to the working-class women of Tralee. In 1899 she ran unsuccessfully for the office of district councillor for the urban district of Tralee. She served as secretary of the Kerry branch of the Soldiers and Sailors Families’ Association during the Boer War. She lived for most of her life with her brother at 7 Prince's Quay, Tralee. She died on 13 December 1913 at Clonskeagh Castle, Dublin and is buried at Mount Jerome Cemetery. Her headstone reads: "She hath done what she could".

== Publications ==
=== As Miss A.M. Rowan ===
- Percy Smythe: a tale of duty (1878)
- Rendelsholme: a novel (1880)
- History of Ireland, as disclosed by Irish statutes passed by Irish parliaments between 1310 and 1800 (1893)

=== As Amos Reade ===
- Norah Moriarty, or, Revelations of modern Irish life (1886)
- Life in the cut. [A novel.] (1888)
