= Caroline Stephen =

English writer on Quakerism

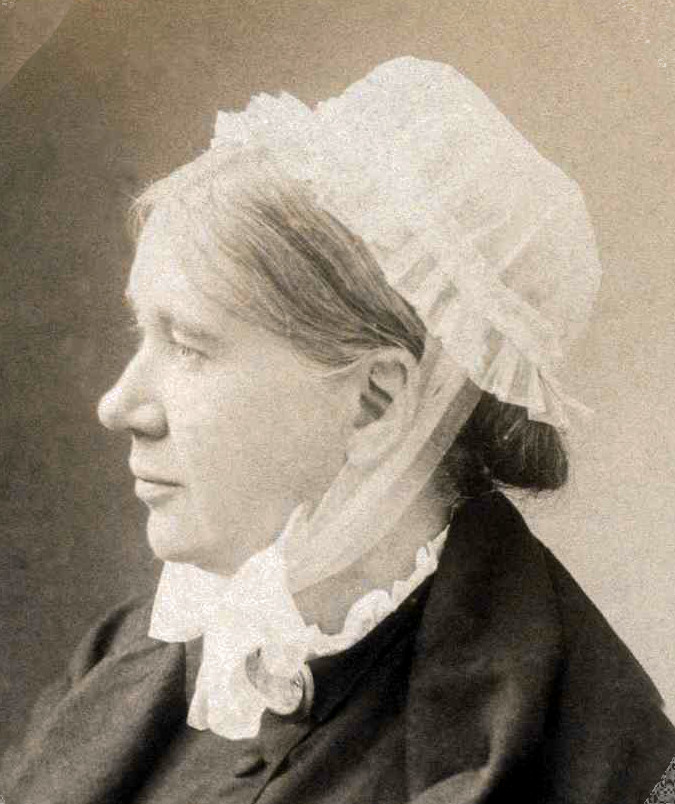
- Caroline Stephen
- Born: Carolina Emelia Stephen; 8 December 1834; London, England
- Died: 7 April 1909 (aged 74); Cambridge, England
- Other names: Milly Stephen
- Known for: Philanthropy and writing on Quakerism
- Parents: James Stephen (father); Jane Venn (mother)
- Relatives: Virginia Woolf (niece)

Caroline Emelia Stephen (8 December 1834 – 7 April 1909), also known as Milly Stephen, was a British philanthropist and a writer on Quakerism. Her niece was Virginia Woolf.

== Life ==
Stephen was born on 8 December 1834 at Kensington Gore on Hyde Park Gate in London. She was the daughter of the abolitionist Sir James and Jane Catherine (born Venn) Stephen. Her father was the permanent under-secretary for the colonies.

Her brothers were the jurist Sir James Fitzjames Stephen and Sir Leslie Stephen (1832–1904) who was the first editor of the Dictionary of National Biography and father of Virginia Woolf. She was educated by governesses in a literary and religious home. Her home moved from London to Brighton and back to Windsor and then Wimbledon.

Her father retired from government work when she was a teenager and she moved again when he became Regius Professor of History at Cambridge University. Stephen is said to have had a love affair that ended badly in 1857. According to her brother, Leslie, her lover left and died in India. However, despite Leslie's expertise as a biographer there does not appear to be any corroboration for this account.

== Good works and becoming a Quaker ==
Stephen was moved to charitable works in the 1860s and she published The Service of the Poor in 1871 after discussing her hypothesis with Florence Nightingale. She also began discussions of faith with Robert Were Fox. She decided to become a Quaker and she left behind her parents' evangelical Christianity. She looked after her mother until she died when she co-founded the Metropolitan Association for Befriending Young Servants with her cousin, Sara Stephen (other claims exist). In 1877, she arranged for a building for women to live in Chelsea. This was Hereford Buildings and it was located on what would become Old Church Street.

In 1879 she had joined the Quakers and she had become a strong supporter of their views. In 1890 she published Quaker Strongholds which set forth her point of view and was well received as a "Quaker classic" even 100 years after publication. This is despite her brother's description of the book as "another little work of hers". Virginia Woolf grew up with her father calling his sister "Silly Milly" or "The Nun". Her book made her the most well known female Quaker amongst those who read books. She was an anti-suffragist as she considered that the silent majority of women did not want a change to the status quo. Her point of view became slightly more popular after her death as the more militant suffragettes made it difficult for non-violent Quakers to support the popular feminist point of view.

== Cambridge ==
Stephen moved to Cambridge in 1895 where she was able to witness to students at Newnham and Girton College about the beliefs of Quakers. She was assisted at Newnham by her niece, Katharine Stephen, who was the principal of Newnham College. When Virginia Woolf had a breakdown after her father died in 1904, she recovered at a friend's home and then spent time with her aunt in Cambridge.

Stephen died at her home in Cambridge on 7 April 1909. She left a bequest of £2,500 to her niece Virginia Woolf. This money was credited by her niece as pivotal to her career, as it freed Woolf to be able to concentrate on thinking; the money, she said, "unveiled the sky to me" (see A Room of One's Own). In 1911 Katharine Stephen published The Vision of Faith and other Essays which contained Caroline Stephen's writing.
