= Harry Vere White =

Irish Anglican bishop

- Bishop of Limerick, Ardfert and Aghadoe
- Diocese: Diocese of Limerick, Ardfert and Aghadoe
- In office: 1921–1933
- Predecessor: Raymond Orpen
- Successor: Charles King Irwin
- Other posts: Archdeacon of Dublin (?–1918); Dean of Christ Church Cathedral, Dublin (1918–1921)

Orders
- Ordination: 1879
- Consecration: 1921

Personal details
- Born: Harry Vere Dawson White; 16 December 1853 Dublin, Ireland
- Died: 20 January 1941 (aged 87) 20 January 1941 (aged 88) Dublin, Ireland
- Denomination: Anglican (Church of Ireland)
- Spouse: Frances Alice Meredith
- Education: Trinity College, Dublin

Harry de Vere Dawson White (16 December 1853 – 20 January 1941) was an Irish Anglican bishop in the 20th century.

He was born in Dublin, the third son of Rev. H. White. He was educated at the Academic Institute and Trinity College, Dublin (whence he gained a Dublin Master of Arts (MA Dubl) and ordained in 1879. He was a curate at Ardbraccan and then went to New Zealand until 1885. He was Rector of Almoritia and Killesk and then Secretary of the SPG until 1905. He was Vicar of St Bartholomew's Dublin and later Archdeacon of Dublin. From 1918 to 1921 he was Dean of Christ Church Cathedral, Dublin when he was ordained to the episcopate as Bishop of Limerick, Ardfert and Aghadoe. He retired in 1933.

He married Frances Alice Meredith, with whom he had four sons and a daughter. Two of their sons were killed in the First World War.

Church of Ireland titles
Preceded by Raymond Orpen	Bishop of Limerick, Ardfert and Aghadoe; 1921–1933	Succeeded by Charles King Irwin
