= William Hallaran =

Irish rugby union player (1861–1917)

- Born: William Hallaran; 19 April 1861 Cahir, Ireland
- Died: 23 January 1917 (aged 55) Jabalpur, India

Rugby union career
International career
| Years | Team | Apps | (Points) |
| 1884 | Ireland | 1 | |

William Hallaran (19 April 1861 – 23 January 1917) was an Irish rugby international. He won one cap against Wales on 12 April 1884.

His father, Thomas Hallaran, was Archdeacon of Ardfert from 1915 to 1922. He was educated at Trinity College Dublin after which he was a doctor in the RAMC.
