= Simon Lumby =

Irish anglican priest

Simon Lumby is an Anglican priest: he has been Archdeacon of Limerick, Ardfert and Aghadoe since 2016.

Lumby was born in 1956 and educated at Hull University, The Open University and St John's College, Nottingham. He was ordained in 2004. His first post was a curacy at Wirksworth. After that he held incumbencies at Thorpe Constantine, Clifton Campville and Killarney.
