= Peter Wyse Jackson =

Irish botanist and biologist (1955 - )

Peter Sherlock Wyse Jackson
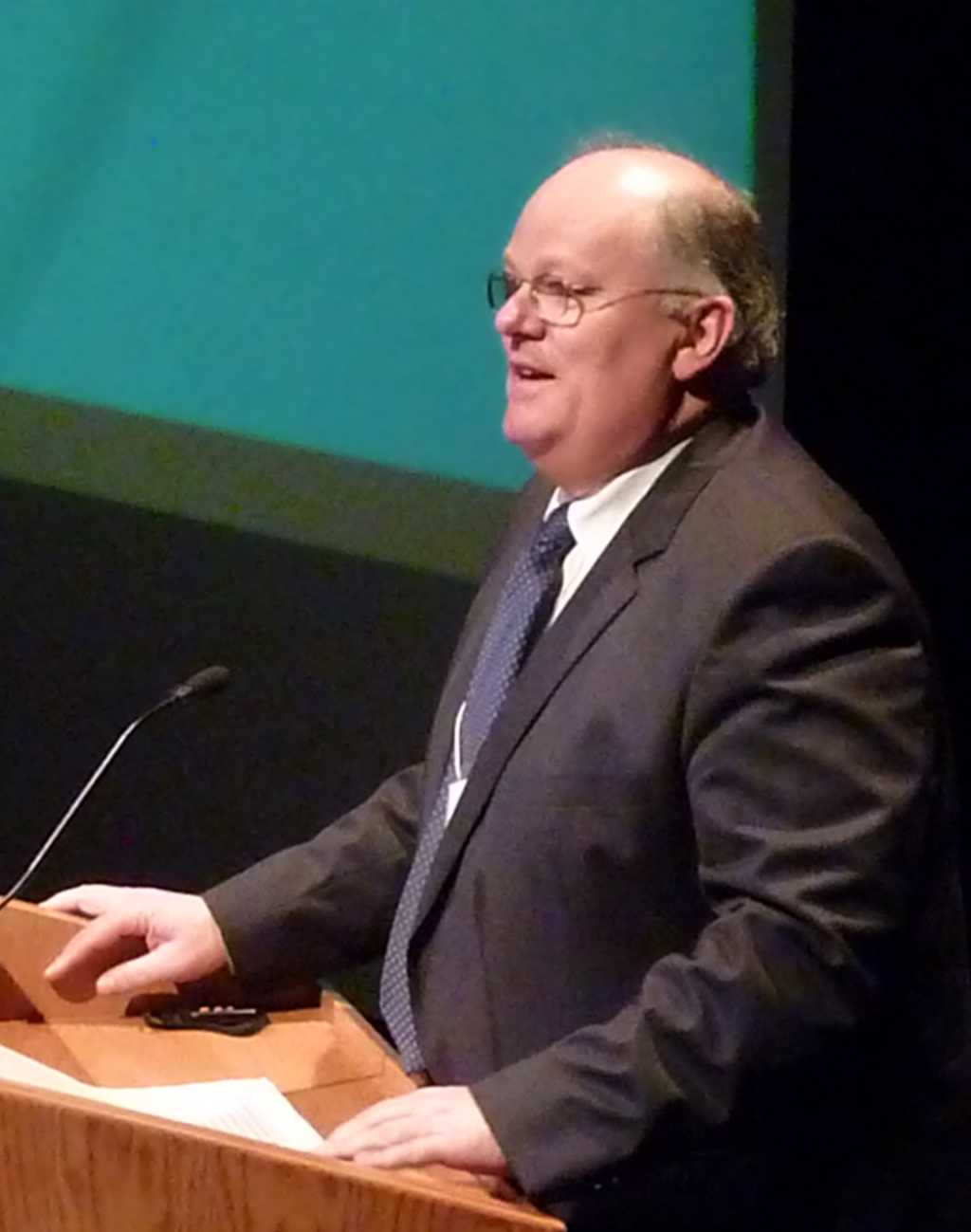
- Jackson in 2011
- Born: 7 June 1955 (age 71); Kilkenny, Ireland
- Education: Trinity College Dublin
- Title: President of Missouri Botanical Garden
- Parents: Robert Wyse Jackson (father); Lois Margery Wyse Jackson (mother)
- Scientific career
- Fields: Plant conservation; Ethnobotany
- Workplaces: Trinity College Dublin Botanic Garden; National Botanic Gardens; Botanic Gardens Conservation International; Washington University in St. Louis
- Author abbrev. (botany): P.S.Wyse Jacks.

Peter Sherlock Wyse Jackson (born 7 June 1955) is an Irish botanist and environmentalist. He is the former president of the Missouri Botanical Garden, and holder of the George Engelmann chair in botany at Washington University in St. Louis.

== Early life ==
Wyse Jackson was born in Kilkenny, Ireland on 7 June 1955 to Robert Wyse Jackson and Lois Margery (née Phair). His father was Bishop of Limerick, Ardfert and Aghadoe and Dean of Cashel.

He grew up with an interest in birds and plants which he indulged on summer holidays to County Kerry. While getting his secondary education at St Columba's College, Dublin he was introduced to systematic botany.

== Education ==
Wyse Jackson was educated at Trinity College Dublin, where he took a BA and an MA in botany, and a PhD for work related to the taxonomy of the Cruciferae of Ireland.

In 1980 he became curator of the botanical garden of the college.

== Career ==
Wyse Jackson left Trinity in 1987 and joined the International Union for Conservation of Nature at Kew, in south-west London. In 1994 he was made secretary-general of Botanic Gardens Conservation International, which he had helped to set up. He also worked on the formulation of the Global Strategy for Plant Conservation of the United Nations.

In 2005 he returned to Ireland to become director of the National Botanic Gardens in Glasnevin, Dublin.

2010, Wyse Jackson succeeded Peter Raven as president of the Missouri Botanical Garden in St. Louis, Missouri. Concurrently with his selection as President of the Missouri Botanical Garden, he was named the George Engelmann Professor of Botany at Washington University in St. Louis.

On 23 January 2024, it was announced that Dr. Wyse Jackson would transition to the role of President Emeritus.

In 2026 he was awarded the Elizabeth Medal of Honour by the Royal Horticultural Society for his leadership on the management and conservation strategies of botanic gardens.

He has written academic papers on plant conservation, botanic gardens and endangered island flora conservation.

== Bibliography ==
- Wyse Jackson, Peter; Sheehy Skeffington, Micheline (1984). Flora of Inner Dublin. Dublin: Royal Dublin Society. ISBN 0-86027-015-7.
- Wyse Jackson, Peter (1987). The story of the botanic gardens of Trinity College Dublin, 1687–1987. Dublin: Trinity College Botanic Garden.
- Cullen, J.; et al. (1988). The Cultivation and Propagation of Threatened Plants: A Proposal for the Documentation of Botanic Garden Methods. Richmond: IUCN Botanic Gardens Conservation Secretariat.
- Wyse Jackson, Peter (1988). Rare and Threatened Palms of the New World: Questionnaire and Preliminary Report on Their Occurrence in Botanic Gardens. Cambridge: Botanic Gardens Conservation Secretariat.
- Heywood, Christine A.; and Vernon H. Heywood; with Peter Wyse Jackson (1990). International Directory of Botanical Gardens (5th ed.). Königstein: Koeltz Scientific Books. ISBN 3-87429-319-X.
- Heywood, V. H.; P. S. Wyse Jackson, eds. (1991). Tropical Botanic Gardens: Their Role in Conservation and Development. London: Academic Press. ISBN 0-12-346850-7.
- Willison, Julia; Peter Wyse Jackson, eds. (1992). A Natural Environment for Learning: Proceedings of an International Congress on Education in Botanic Gardens Held in Utrecht, The Netherlands, 14–16 May 1991. Richmond: Botanic Gardens Conservation International. ISBN 0-9520275-0-X.
- Wyse-Jackson, Peter (1994). Irish Trees and Shrubs. Belfast: Appletree Press. ISBN 0-86281-420-0.
- Wyse Jackson, P. S.; J. R. Akeroyd (1994). Guidelines to Be Followed in the Design of Plant Conservation or Recovery Plans. Strasbourg: Council of Europe Press. ISBN 92-871-2494-9.
- Akeroyd, John; Noel McGough; Peter Wyse Jackson (1994). A CITES Manual for Botanic Gardens. Richmond: Botanic Gardens Conservation International. ISBN 0-9520275-1-8.
- Akeroyd, John; Peter Wyse Jackson (1995). A Handbook for Botanic Gardens on the Reintroduction of Plants to the Wild. Richmond: Botanic Gardens Conservation International. ISBN 0-9520275-2-6.
- Wyse Jackson, Peter S.; Julia Willison (1996). Plant Conservation in the Caribbean Islands: The Role of Botanic Gardens: Proceedings of a Caribbean Islands Botanic Gardens Workshop Held from Saturday 29 June to Monday 1 July 1996 in Grand Cayman, West Indies. Richmond: Botanic Gardens Conservation International.
- Burbridge, Brinsley; Peter Wyse Jackson, eds. (1998). Conservation Action Plan for Botanic Gardens of the Caribbean Islands. Richmond: Botanic Gardens Conservation International. ISBN 0-9520275-5-0.
- Wyse Jackson, P. S.; Sutherland, L. A. (2000). International Agenda for Botanic Gardens in Conservation. Richmond: Botanic Gardens Conservation International. ISBN 0-9520275-9-3.
- Cheney, Judith; Joaquin Navarrete Navarro; Peter Wyse Jackson, eds. (2000). Action Plan for Botanic Gardens in the European Union. Meise: National Botanic Garden of Belgium. ISBN 90-72619-45-5.
- Wyse Jackson, Peter (2014). Ireland's Generous Nature: The Past and Present Uses of Wild Plants in Ireland. Missouri Botanical Garden Press. ISBN 978-0915279784.
