= Evelyn Hodges =

Irish bishop

Evelyn Charles Hodges (8 August 1887 – 18 March 1980) was an eminent Irish clergyman during the mid-20th century.

He was born in Towlerton House, County Carlow on 8 August 1887 into an ecclesiastical family. His father was the Rev. W. H. Hodges. He was educated at Rathmines School and Trinity College, Dublin and ordained in 1911. He was a Curate at Drumcondra and then Rathmines. Following this he spent seven years as Diocesan Inspector of Schools for Dublin, Glendalough and Kildare before returning to Rathmines as its incumbent, serving from 1924 until 1927. From 1928 to 1943 he was Principal of the Church of Ireland Training College for Teachers, when he became the Bishop of Limerick, Ardfert and Aghadoe. He resigned in 1960 and died on 18 March 1980.

He wrote a biography of the Church of Ireland clergyman Ernest Lewis-Crosby.

Church of Ireland titles
Preceded by Charles King Irwin	Bishop of Limerick, Ardfert and Aghadoe; 1943–1960	Succeeded by Robert Wyse Jackson
