= Vaughan Nash =

British journalist and economist

Vaughan Nash CB CVO

Principal Private Secretary to the Prime Minister
- In office 1908–1911
- Prime Minister: H. H. Asquith
- Preceded by: Arthur Ponsonby
- Succeeded by: Maurice Bonham-Carter

Personal details
- Born: Vaughan Robinson Nash; 1861 Clifton, Bristol
- Died: 16 December 1932 (aged 70–71) Woodgreen, Hampshire
- Spouse: Rosalind Nash (m. 1892)
- Children: 2
- Awards: CB (1909); CVO (1911)

Vaughan Robinson Nash CB CVO (1861 – 16 December 1932) was a British journalist, economist and the husband of Rosalind Nash. He was a correspondent of Florence Nightingale, his wife's aunt. Nash served as the Principal Private Secretary in the Coalition Ministry of H. H. Asquith.

== Biography ==
Nash was born in Clifton, Bristol to Charles Nash, a timber merchant, and Sarah Ann. He began his career as journalist covering the London Dock Strike of 1889. He later became a "special correspondent", covering issues in crisis hit foreign countries, in particular drawing attention to the problem of hunger within the territories of the British Empire, an issue that was sometimes neglected by administrators and politicians.

He was appointed Companion of the Order of the Bath (CB) in the 1909 Birthday Honours and Commander of the Royal Victorian Order (CVO) in the 1911 Coronation Honours.

He had two sons and a daughter. A daughter and son preceded him in death.

He died in Woodgreen near Salisbury, aged 71.

== Publications ==
- 'The Great Famine and its Causes' by Vaughan Nash, The Economic Journal, Vol. 11, No. 44 (Dec., 1901), pp. 537–541.

Government offices
Preceded by Arthur Ponsonby	Principal Private Secretary to the Prime Minister; 1908–1911	Succeeded by Maurice Bonham-Carter
