= Harry Lushington Stephen =

British barrister

Sir Harry Lushington Stephen, 3rd Baronet (2 March 1860 – 1 November 1945) was a British barrister and Judge of the Calcutta High Court in British India.

The third son of Sir James Fitzjames Stephen, Harry Lushington was educated at Rugby School before matriculating at Trinity College, Cambridge in 1878, graduating LLB in 1882 and LLM in 1904. He was called to the Bar in 1885 and practised on the South Wales Circuit from 1886 to 1901. He became a judge of the Calcutta High Court, on 18 November 1901. He was knighted in 1913. He retired in 1914.

On his return to England, he was Alderman of the London County Council from 1916 to 1928. He was appointed an Officer of the Order of the Crown of Belgium for services rendered in connection with the First World War. He died in 1945 at Hale Close, Fordingbridge.

In 1904, he married Barbara, youngest daughter of William Shore Nightingale of Embley, Hampshire and Lea Hurst, Derbyshire. He had one son, James Alexander Stephen, who succeeded to the baronetcy.

== Works ==
He is the author of Law of Support and Subsidence, 1890. It was "a useful little monograph".

He was the editor of

- The fourteenth edition of Oke's Synopsis (1893)
- The eighth edition of Oke's Formulist
- State Trials: Political and Social (1899)

He was joint editor, with Herbert Stephen, of the fifth edition of Stephen's Digest of the Criminal Law (1894) and the fifth edition of Stephen's Digest of the Law of Evidence (1899).

Coat of arms of Harry Lushington Stephen
Crest An eagle displayed with two heads Sable resting the dexter claw on an increscent and the sinister on a decrescent both Or. Escutcheon Argent on a chevron between two crescents in chief and a sinister hand couped at the wrist in base Gules an escallop between two mullets of the first. Motto Sursum

Baronetage of the United Kingdom
Preceded by Herbert Stephen	Baronet (of De Vere Gardens); 1932–1945	Succeeded by James Stephen
