= Ashford School =

Coordinates: 51°08′59″N 0°52′42″E

Location
- East Hill; Ashford, Kent, TN24 8PB; UK

Information
- Type: Private day and boarding
- Motto: Esse Quam Videri (to be, rather than to seem to be)
- Religious affiliation: Church of England
- Established: 1898
- Headteacher: Ashley Currie
- Gender: Co-educational
- Age: 3 months to 18
- Enrolment: 1000
- Houses: Nightingale, Thimann, Atkins, Newfoundland
- Affiliation: United Church Schools Trust
- Website: ashfordschool.co.uk

Ashford School is a coeducational private boarding and day school in East Hill, Ashford, Kent. There are 480 students in the senior school (ages 11 to 18) and 360 in the prep school (ages 3 to 11).

The school is owned and run by the United Church Schools Trust. It is a member of the Headmasters' and Headmistresses' Conference (HMC).

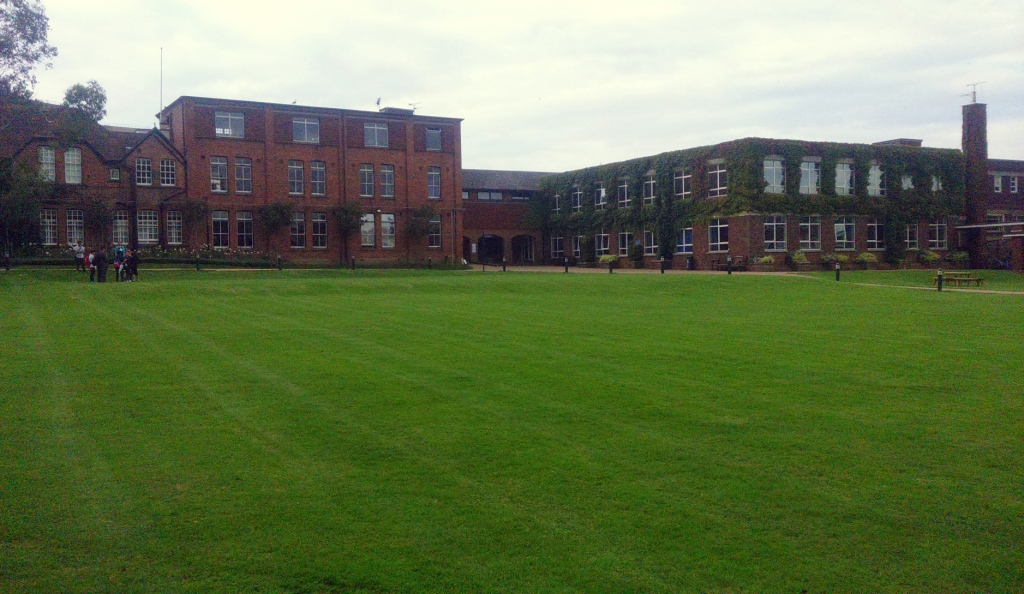
Ashford Senior School grounds

== History ==
The school was set up in 1898 by Muriel Thimann, who opened a small women's school on Queens Road, Ashford. The school moved to Wellesley Road in 1903 and then to two houses on High Street in 1905. In 1910, Anne Edwards bought the school and renamed it "the Modern High School for Girls". The school expanded into another adjacent house on High Street and then moved to bigger premises on East Hill in 1913. In 2005, it merged with Friars Prep School in Great Chart, and in 2006, boys were admitted in some year groups. Ashford School is now a co-educational school from the age of 3 to 18 offering boarding and day facilities.

== Space shuttle experiment ==
In 1992, a science experiment designed by four girls at the school flew on the Space Shuttle on flight STS-47. The experiment had been designed in 1985 by the girls who had won a competition organised by Independent Television News. The chemical garden experiment was successful but the Liesegang rings failed to operate correctly due to friction in parts of the mechanism. On their return, they were displayed in the London Science Museum. The seven-year delay had been caused by the Space Shuttle Challenger disaster which occurred in 1986 shortly before the intended flight.

== Notable alumni ==
- Petronella Barker (born 1942), actress
- Liv Boeree, model, TV presenter and poker player
- Sally Brampton, journalist, writer and magazine editor
- Lucy Cooke, National Geographic explorer, documentary producer/presenter, author and zoologist
- Wendy Cope, poet
- Anna Turley, former Labour MP and Chairwoman of the Co-operative Party since 8 June 2019
