= Edward Day (priest) =

Edward Day (22 December 1738 – 27 January 1808) was Archdeacon of Ardfert from 1782 until his death.

He was born near Tralee, one of the seven children of the Reverend John Day of Lohercannon, County Kerry, Chancellor of Ardfert. His mother was Lucy FitzGerald, daughter of Sir Maurice FitzGerald, 14th Knight of Kerry and Eleanor Crosbie. His paternal grandfather, also named Edward, had been a prosperous merchant, who married Ellen Quarry of Cork city. The Days, originally from East Anglia, had come to Ireland in the seventeenth century. His mother's family were a branch of the FitzGerald dynasty, and had held the title Knight of Kerry for centuries. His four brothers included John Day, Mayor of Cork in 1807, and Mr. Justice Robert Day of the Court of King's Bench (Ireland). Edward and Robert were very close throughout their lives, and Robert in his diary records his intense grief at Edward's death.

He was educated at Trinity College, Dublin. He became Rector of Kiltallagh, Castlemaine, County Kerry in 1771, and was later Minister at Holy Trinity, Cork. He lived at Beaufort, County Kerry.

He married Barbara Forward, who was probably the eldest daughter of William Forward, of the prominent Forward family of Fermoy, County Cork, and his wife Margaret Hely, in 1769. They had six children, including the Reverend Edward Day, who succeeded his father as Rector of Kiltallagh but outlived him by less than a year, Robert Day, who was High Sheriff of Kerry in 1808, and Lucy who married the Reverend William Godfrey, Rector of Kenmare.

According to his brother Robert, he died after a three-day illness. Robert was deeply affected by Edward's death, mourning him as a man of "fine parts and great erudition and of benevolence unbounded".

Church of Ireland titles
| Preceded by George Massy | Archdeacon of Ardfert; 1782–1808 | Succeeded by Thomas Grace |
