= Sally Brampton =

English journalist, writer, and magazine editor

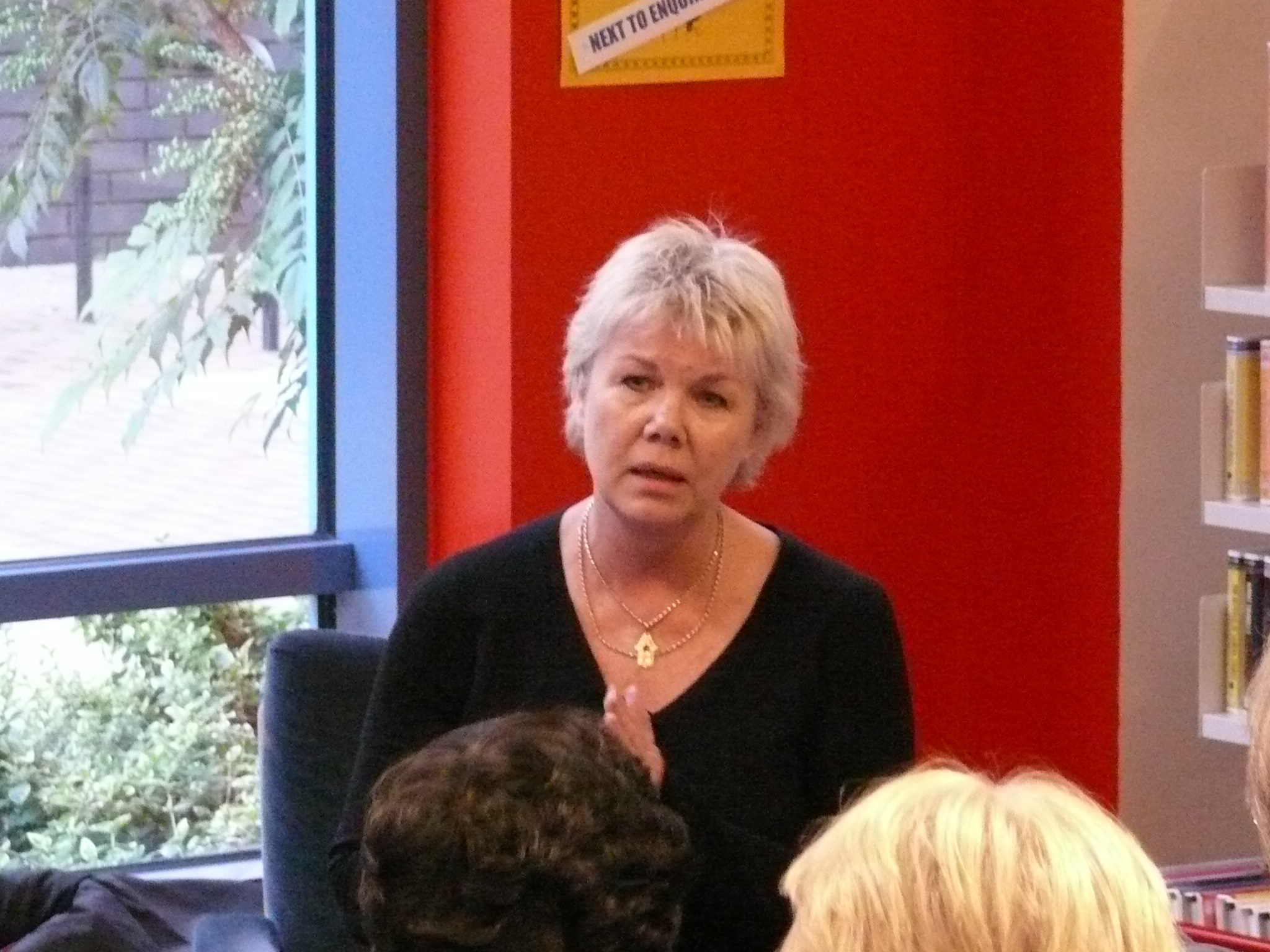
- Brampton in 2010
- Born: 15 July 1955; Brunei
- Died: 10 May 2016 (aged 60); St Leonards-on-Sea, England
- Education: Saint Martin's School of Art
- Occupation: Journalist

Sally Jane Brampton (15 July 1955 – 10 May 2016) was an English journalist, writer, and magazine editor. She was the founding editor of the British edition of the French magazine Elle in 1985.

== Early life ==
She was born in Brunei, on the island of Borneo, the daughter of Pamela and Roy Brampton; her father was a manager for oil firm Shell. Brampton was the middle child with an elder and younger brother. Her father's job meant that the family's existence was nomadic with periods living in many countries. In all she attended twelve schools, among which were a school in Rio de Janeiro, Ashford School in Kent, where she boarded, and St Clare’s Hall School in Oxford. After leaving school, she studied fashion at Saint Martin's School of Art.

After winning a competition, Brampton joined Vogue in 1978, and then became the fashion editor of The Observer in 1981.

== Launch editor of British Elle ==
Brampton was appointed the first editor of the British edition of the French magazine Elle which published its first issue in November 1985. "There was a whole new generation [of women] fumbling its way towards tomorrow", she said later. "Elle was the first mainstream magazine to act as a voice for that generation." It was aimed at professional women with an interest in fashion and shopping, rather than emotions and personal relationship concerns of other titles. The writers Jeanette Winterson, Julie Burchill and Tony Parsons were among those who contributed to Elle under Brampton's stewardship. By this time, she had become a close friend of the designer Jasper Conran.

Soon after Elle's launch in Britain, Naomi Campbell then not yet 16, was spotted in Covent Garden by a talent scout, and Elle's use of Campbell as a cover model in April 1986 helped to launch her career. Brampton opposed using models who were underweight. The word "diet" was banished and she ran features on "healthy eating plans" instead. After clashes with the publisher of the magazine, Hachette, Brampton left the company in 1989 to develop her career as a novelist and freelance writer. Management changed frequently and she had tired of the early mornings.

== Later life and career ==
Brampton was appointed as the editor of Red magazine in November 1999. Red was then a fairly new title, which had launched in January 1998. It was thought at the time that Brampton had been appointed to the post to position the title for women over the age of 40. She remained in the post for about a year. At the time she was sacked in October 2000, it was asserted that her decision to run political articles, including interviews with Prime Minister Tony Blair and government minister Mo Mowlam had led to a decline in circulation.

By January 2001, she had been diagnosed as suffering from clinical depression. A memoir, Shoot the Damn Dog (2008), a partial reference to Churchill's description of his depression as a "black dog", recounts Brampton's experience of the condition and periods as an in-patient. The journalist Simon Garfield, writing for The Observer commented that "her story is compelling and unflinching and she makes no claims that her descent and slow recovery will match those of others".

From 2006, she was an agony aunt for The Sunday Times Style supplement; her advice column called Aunt Sally was discontinued by the paper in 2014. After this she wrote a similar column for the Daily Mail. In this period, she also wrote for the women's magazine Psychologies and the gardening title Easy Living; she was a keen gardener. Her novels were Good Grief (1992), Lovesick, Concerning Lily, and Love, Always (2000).

== Personal life ==
Brampton married and divorced three times. She was briefly married to the television and film director Nigel Cole, whose best known film is Calendar Girls (2003). Her second marriage was to the television producer and executive Jonathan Powell in 1990; the couple had a daughter, Molly, who now works in publishing. The marriage ended around 2000. Her third husband was Tom Wnek, who has been employed in ethical marketing. Brampton moved to St Leonards, East Sussex from London in 2010, after separating from her third husband.

== Death ==
It is believed Brampton killed herself by "walk[ing] into the sea at St Leonards" on 10 May 2016. A spokesman for Sussex Police said there were no "suspicious circumstances". A letter from Brampton's psychiatrist, dated from 18 March 2016, stated that she was "in crisis" and that she had "disengaged" from local services and had "painted a very jaundiced view of them".

Her former husband, Nigel Cole, said he was "devastated" to hear his ex-wife had "lost her battle with depression". The inquest into her death agreed that it was her own choice to enter the sea, but said that the health services had "missed opportunities" to help her, describing several occasions when she approached doctors but was not helped appropriately.

The editor-in-chief of Elle at the time Brampton died, Lorraine Candy, wrote on the magazine's website that the magazine Brampton developed was a "breath of fresh air, mixing high street with high end, having a brave and sometimes contrary opinion, questioning the norm and championing new thinkers." Candy also wrote, "Smart, tough and stylish, Sally [Brampton] was also elegantly charming. She was a gentlewoman in the truest sense of the word, an Editor-in-Chief who discovered and nurtured new talent with the same enthusiasm as she nurtured her family and friends."
