= Church of Ireland College of Education =

Former teacher training facility in Ireland

Coordinates: 53.318538°N 6.261322°W

- (Irish: Coláiste Oideachais Eaglais na hÉireann)
- CICE Logo
- Former names: The Kildare Place Training Institution, Church of Ireland College
- Motto: Pro Christo Discere Ac Docere
- Motto in English: To learn and teach on behalf of Christ
- Type: Church of Ireland
- Active: 1811–2016
- Affiliations: University of Dublin
- Principal: Dr. Anne Lodge
- Location: Rathmines, Dublin, Ireland
- Website: www.cice.ie

The Church of Ireland College of Education (Irish: Coláiste Oideachais Eaglais na hÉireann), or C.I.C.E. as it was more commonly known, was one of the Republic of Ireland's five Colleges of Education which provided a Bachelor of Education (B.Ed.) degree, the qualification generally required to teach in Irish primary schools. Its degrees were awarded by Trinity College (the University of Dublin), as for the Marino Institute of Education and Froebel College of Education. It also provided postgraduate courses in Learning Support and Special Educational Needs and a Certificate Course for Special Needs Assistants.

The college was located in Rathmines in Dublin. It was eventually the oldest teacher training establishment in Ireland. On 1 October 2016, the college was incorporated into Dublin City University.

== History ==
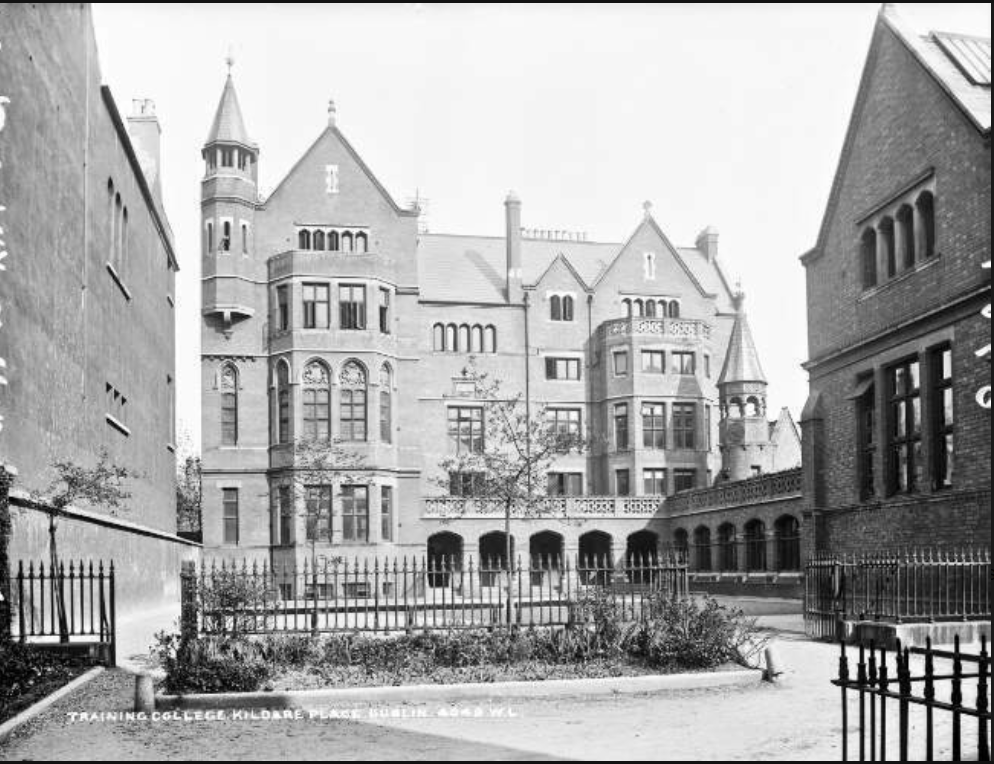
Church of Ireland Training College at Kildare Place.

=== Origins and changes of control ===
The history of the Church of Ireland College of Education began in 1811, when a primary teacher training college known as The Kildare Place Training Institution was founded in Dublin by the Society for Promoting Education of the Poor in Ireland. In the 1850s this institution was taken over by the Church Education Society for the purpose of training Anglican teachers for church schools. This in turn was taken over in 1878 by the General Synod of the Church of Ireland and six years later became a recognised denominational college with the Archbishop of Dublin as ex officio manager and chairman of the Board of Governors. In 1884, under the guidance of Archbishop Plunket, it affiliated to the state national school system.

=== 20th century ===
In 1963 it was decided to sell the Kildare Place site, and Rathmines Castle was purchased for the College and school, to which they moved in 1969. In 1934, the Principal, the Rev. Canon E.C. Hodges in 1934, had commissioned chairs and an altar, and oversaw the conversion of a classroom into a College Chapel, which was moved to St Mary's (Donnybrook parish) when the college moved to Rathmines.

=== Closure and legacy ===
In 2011 the college celebrated its bicentenary, with a number of events celebrating the college's contribution to education in Ireland.

In 2012, the Minister of Education, Ruairí Quinn, made comments regarding the reduction in the number of teacher training colleges, with a number of small colleges earmarked for closure or encouraged to merge with other institutions. Following this, the board of governors, including the principal, Anne Lodge and the Archbishop of Dublin, Michael Jackson, ended the historic link with Trinity College, and entered into negotiations with Dublin City University where CICE was fully incorporated on 1 October 2016. This proved controversial, and many people including former CICE governors and leading Church of Ireland members believed that the college was closed without adequate consultation from the archbishop and the principal.

The current DCU Institute of Education comprises DCU's own Education Department, CICE, Mater Dei Institute, and St Patrick's College, Dublin (Drumcondra). The college's religious element is overseen within DCU by the Church of Ireland Centre (CIC), based on the DCU All Hallows Campus, headed up by Rev. Prof. Anne Lodge, the final Principal of CICE.

In 2022, and following the closure of St Mary's in 2020, the altar furniture from the original Church of Ireland Training College at Kildare Place was moved to and rededicated in All Hallows Chapel, All Hallows College Chapel, DCU, where the Church of Ireland Centre is, and reconsecrated by the Archbishop of Dublin, Michael Jackson, for use by Church of Ireland Centre and community there.

== Academic offering ==
In the 1970s a Bachelor of Education degree was introduced and subsequently taught jointly by Trinity College (University of Dublin) and the Church of Ireland College of Education. The CICE course had a mandatory religious element preparing teachers to teach in Protestant run primary schools.

== Facilities ==
Student accommodation was also available on campus for both students of the college or of other colleges.

== Principals ==
Principals of the College included:

- Rev. Canon Henry Kingsmill Moore DD (1884-1927) - first Principal
- Rev. Canon Evelyn Hodges (1928 to 1942)
- Rev. Canon R.J. Ross, M.A.
- Dr. Kenneth Milne (1975-1984)
- Mr. Sydney Blain (1984-2009)
- Dr. Anne Lodge (2009-2016) - final Principal

== Notable alumni ==
- Patrick Kennedy - bookseller, writer and folklorist, trained as a teacher in Kildare Place
- Trevor Sargent - former TD and Green Party Leader, subsequently trained as a priest, trained as a teacher
