= Robert Gough (priest) =

Irish Anglican priest

Robert Gough was an Irish Anglican priest.

Gough was educated at Balliol College, Oxford. He was Precentor of Limerick Cathedral in 1615; and was Archdeacon of Ardfert from 1628 to 1641.

Church of Ireland titles
Preceded by John Ducey	Archdeacon of Ardfert; 1628–1641	Succeeded by Thomas Parsons
