= Charles King Irwin =

Irish clergyman

The Right Reverend Charles King Irwin
- Bishop of Connor
- In office: 1945–1956
- Other posts: Bishop of Limerick, Ardfert and Aghadoe (1934–1942); Bishop of Down, Connor and Dromore (1942–1944)

Personal details
- Born: 30 March 1874
- Died: 15 January 1960 (aged 85)
- Denomination: Church of Ireland
- Spouse: Louisa Jane née Royse
- Education: The Royal School, Armagh; Trinity College, Dublin

Charles King Irwin (also Irvine; 30 March 1874 – 15 January 1960) was an eminent Irish clergyman in the middle third of the 20th century.

Born on 30 March 1874 into an eminent ecclesiastical family, he was ordained in 1898 and began his career with a curacy at Brantry, after which he was Vicar of Derrynoose and then Middletown. Promotion to be Archdeacon of Armagh followed in 1924, (his father, Charles King Irwin, also held that role) after which he was elevated to the episcopate as the Bishop of Limerick, Ardfert and Aghadoe. Like all Church of Ireland bishops he was awarded an honorary Doctorate of Divinity by Trinity College, Dublin. Translated to Down, Connor and Dromore in 1942. He relinquished the bishopric of Down and Dromore, but retained that of Connor when the diocese was split on 1 January 1945. He retired on 31 May 1956 and died on 15 January 1960.

Church of Ireland titles
Preceded by Harry Vere White	Bishop of Limerick, Ardfert and Aghadoe; 1934 – 1942	Succeeded by Evelyn Hodges
Preceded by John MacNeice	Bishop of Down, Connor and Dromore; 1942 – 1944	Succeeded by Diocese divided
Preceded by first separate bishop since before the Reformation	Bishop of Connor; 1945 – 1956	Succeeded by Cyril Elliott
