= Daniel Lysacht =

Irish Anglican priest

Daniel Lysacht was an Irish Anglican priest in the 17th century.

He was appointed the Archdeacon of Aghadoe and Archdeacon of Ardfert in 1621; and Precentor of Ardfert Cathedral in 1624.
