= Elizabeth Medal of Honour =

Royal Horticultural Society award

The Elizabeth Medal of Honour (EMH) is awarded to British non-horticulturalists and international horticultural and non-horticulturalists whose work has had a significant impact on the advancement of science, art or practice of horticulture.

The award was established in 2023 to celebrate "both Her Majesty's glorious reign and the work she did to raise the profile of UK horticulture both nationally and internationally through her visits to RHS Chelsea Flower Show and wider work." The Royal Horticultural Society's rules state that only seventy individuals can hold the EMH at any given time, in commemoration of the seventy years of Queen Elizabeth II's reign. Therefore, the honour may not be awarded every year, but may be made to multiple recipients in other years.

The Elizabeth Medal of Honour will join the Victoria Medal of Honour, which was established in 1897 with the consent of Her Majesty Queen Victoria, to enable the RHS Council to give the highest possible honour and recognition to Bristish horticulturalists by the Society. In recognition of the duration of Queen Victoria's reign only 63 medals may be held at any one time.

== Awards ==
=== 2023 ===
- Janet Fookes, Baroness Fookes
- Piet Oudolf
- Judy Ling Wong

=== 2024 ===
- Rosie Atkins
- Olivia Chapple OBE
- Charles Dowding
- George Plumptre
- Charles 'Chipper' Rice Wichman

=== 2025 ===
- Sir Nicholas Bacon
- Dr Clare Hermans
- John Sonnier

=== 2026 ===
- Robert Bartlett Jr
- Dr Peter Wyse Jackson
- Dr Henrik Sjöman
- Bill Thomas
- Andrew Fisher Tomlin
- Christopher Woodward
