= Queen Elizabeth II Medal =

Queen Elizabeth II Medal may refer to:

- Queen Elizabeth II Coronation Medal
- Queen Elizabeth II Silver Jubilee Medal
- Queen Elizabeth II Golden Jubilee Medal
- Queen Elizabeth II Diamond Jubilee Medal
- Queen Elizabeth II Platinum Jubilee Medal

== See also ==
- List of things named after Elizabeth II
- Elizabeth Medal (disambiguation)
- Queen Elisabeth Medal, a Belgian award of World War I
