= United Church Schools Trust =

Education charity in the United Kingdom

The United Church Schools Trust (UCST) is a large education charity in the United Kingdom which owns and operates a group of 14 private schools. The charity is operating under the name United Learning as of 2012.

== History ==
UCST was founded in 1883 (as the ‘Church Schools Company’) to extend the reach of academic education in Victorian England and to educate young women based on Christian (and particularly Anglican) principles. The majority of its schools are now co-educational. As a group, it is non-denominational and welcomes pupils of all faiths and none to its schools.

In 2002, it established the United Learning Trust (now United Learning) as a fully owned subsidiary to extend UCST’s work and ethos into the state sector through the Academies Programme. Together, UCST schools and ULT academies educate more than 70,000 pupils.

UCST is one of the 100 largest UK charitable organisations. Its central office is based in Peterborough, Cambridgeshire.

== Schools ==
UCST currently owns and manages 14 independent schools across England:

- AKS Lytham
- Ashford School
- Banstead Prep School
- Coworth Flexlands School
- Dunottar School, Reigate
- Embley
- Chafyn-Godolphin School
- Guildford High School
- Lincoln Minster School
- Rowan Preparatory School
- St Ives School for Girls
- Surbiton High School
- The Royal School, Haslemere
- Tranby School

Four schools are boarding and day; the rest are day only. Three schools are single-sex; the rest are co-educational. The schools are accredited through the Independent Schools Council (ISC).

== Academies ==
UCST's subsidiary charity the United Learning Trust operates 90 academies and one City Technology College.

== United Learning ==
In 2012 ULT and UCST rebranded to operate under one name, United Learning. They legally remain as two separate charities.
