= John Smith (bishop of Killala and Achonry) =

Irish Anglican priest

John Smith was an Irish Anglican priest in Ireland in the seventeenth century.

A native of Athboy, he was educated at Trinity College, Dublin. He became the Rector of Inniskeen in 1635. He was Archdeacon of Ardfert from 1664 to 1666 when he became Dean of Limerick. He was appointed to the episcopate as Bishop of Killala and Achonry in 1679 but died the following year on 7 March.
