= William Foley (priest) =

William Malcolm Foley was Archdeacon of Ardfert from 1915 to 1922.

== Biography ==
Foley was educated at Trinity College, Dublin and ordained in 1878. He began his career with curacies at Easky and Tuam. He held incumbencies at Templemichael, County Longford, Askeaton, Doonfeeny and Tralee.
