= Cahirnarry =

Coordinates: 52°37′12″N 8°33′33″W

Cahirnarry (also Cahernarry) was a parish in County Limerick, Ireland. It was settled in 1837 with nearly 2,000 inhabitants over nearly equal acreage covered by meadows, pastures, limestone quarries, and a bog. It had a school, church, and police station.
