= Embley, Hampshire =

Village in Hampshire, England

Coordinates: 50.988814°N 1.545203°W

Embley
- Location within Hampshire
- OS grid reference: SU3201721144
- Civil parish: Wellow, Hampshire
- District: Test Valley
- Shire county: Hampshire
- Region: South East
- Country: England
- Sovereign state: United Kingdom
- Post town: ROMSEY
- Postcode district: SO51
- Dialling code: 01962
- Police: Hampshire and Isle of Wight
- Fire: Hampshire and Isle of Wight
- Ambulance: South Central
- UK Parliament: Romsey and Southampton North

Embley is a small village in the Test Valley district of Hampshire, England in the United Kingdom. Its nearest town is Romsey, which lies approximately 3.5 miles (4.8 km) east from the village. It is in the civil parish of Wellow.

A famous 19th century resident was Florence Nightingale, who for much of her childhood was raised in the parish at her family's home Embley Park.
