= Embley Park =

Family home of Florence Nightingale

Coordinates: 50°59′08″N 1°32′34″W

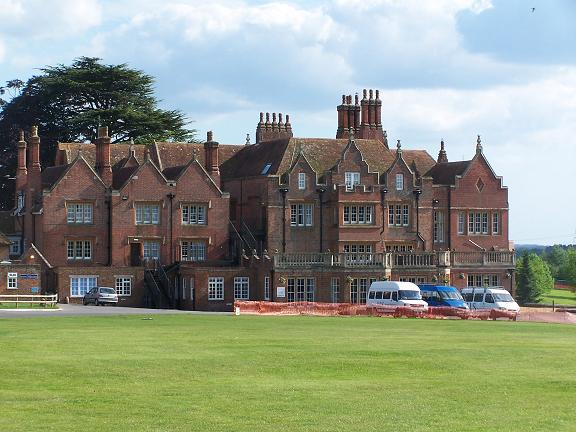
Embley Park, now a school, was the family home of Florence Nightingale.

Embley Park, in Wellow (near Romsey, Hampshire), was the family home of Florence Nightingale from 1825 until her death in 1910. It is also where Florence Nightingale claimed she had received her divine calling from God. It is now the location of Embley, a co-educational independent school for 3–18 year olds. Embley was known as Hampshire Collegiate School until September 2019.

== The Home ==
In 1826, Florence Nightingale's father William Nightingale purchased Embley Park house for the family to use as a permanent residence with Lea Hurst being used as a summer residence. The house was the larger of the two and was described as:

a good-sized plain square house of the late Georgian period, the situation warm and sheltered, the gardens very large and exceptionally fine. The shooting was good, London was reasonably near, and Fanny's two married sisters, Mrs Nicholson at Waverley Abbey near Farnham and Mrs Bonham-Carter at Fair Oak, near Winchester, were within easy reach.

Nightingale claimed she had received her first divine calling from God in 1837 at Embley whilst she sat underneath a tree in the grounds. She then stayed there after her return from the Crimean War for some time before returning for visits whilst living in London. After her death in London in 1910, her body was brought by train back to Romsey and her coffin carried from the station to the church at East Wellow where she is buried.

The building has been Grade II listed since May 1984, giving it legal protection from unauthorised alteration or demolition.

== The school ==
A school was first established at Embley Park in 1946. Mergers with various other schools followed, resulting in the creation of Hampshire Collegiate School in 2006. The school changed its name to Embley in September 2019. The school is part of the United Church Schools Trust.
