= Robert Wyse Jackson =

Irish Bishop and author (1908–1976)

The Right Rev Robert Wyse Jackson

Bishop of Limerick, Ardfert and Aghadoe
- In office 1961–1970

Personal details
- Born: 12 July 1908
- Died: 21 October 1976 (aged 68)
- Spouse(s): (1) Margaretta Nolan née Macdonald; Lois Margery née Phair
- Education: Trinity College, Dublin

Robert Wyse Jackson (12 July 1908 – 21 October 1976) was an Irish Bishop and author.

Educated at Trinity College, Dublin, he qualified as a barrister but was then ordained in 1934. He began his career as Curate of St James' Church, Broughton, Salford after which he was Curate-in-charge of Corbally and then Rector of St Michael’s, Limerick from 1940 to 1943. He was Dean of the Cathedral Church of St John the Baptist and St Patrick’s Rock, Cashel from 1946 to 1960 and then Bishop of Limerick, Ardfert and Aghadoe from 1961 until his retirement in 1970.

Wyse Jackson was born in Kilcullen, County Kildare, Ireland, the son of Richard William Jackson and Belinda Hester Sherlock. He married twice; first to Margaretta Nolan McDonald, and second to Lois Margery Phair. He had seven children including Peter Wyse Jackson.

Church of Ireland titles
Preceded by Evelyn Charles Hodges	Bishop of Limerick, Ardfert and Aghadoe; 1961–1970	Succeeded by Donald Arthur Richard Caird
