= John William Cunningham =

Evangelical clergyman of the Church of England

John William Cunningham (1780–1861) was an evangelical clergyman of the Church of England. He was known also as a writer and an editor.

== Life ==
Cunningham was born in London on 3 January 1780. He was educated at private schools, his last tutor being the Rev. H. Jowett of Little Dunham, Norfolk; there he formed a close friendship with his fellow-pupils Charles Grant and Robert Grant. Cunningham entered St. John's College, Cambridge. He was fifth wrangler in 1802, and was elected to a fellowship at his college.

After passing some months with the Grants in Edinburgh, Cunningham was ordained in 1802 to the curacy of Ripley, Surrey. He became curate to John Venn, vicar of Clapham and prominent in the Clapham sect. In 1811 Cunningham became vicar of Harrow, the presentation to which had been bought by his father-in-law. He held this post until his death on 30 September 1861.

Cunningham was elected in 1818 an honorary life-governor of the Church Missionary Society, and was editor of the Christian Observer from 1850 to 1858.

== Works ==
One of his books, the Velvet Cushion, gave an account from the evangelical point of view of the parties in the church of England since the English Reformation, and was a popular success. In it Venn was described by Cunningham under the name "Berkely". The first edition was published in 1814, the tenth in 1816. He also wrote:

- World without Souls, 1805 (6th ed. 1816).
- Christianity in India (an essay on the duty of introducing the Christian religion), 1808.
- Observations in reply to Edward Maltby's Thoughts on the Danger of circulating the Scriptures among the Lower Orders, 1812.
- Church of England Missions, 1814.
- De Rancé, a poem.
- Conciliatory Suggestions on Regeneration, 1816.
- Observations on Friendly Societies, 1817.
- Sancho, or the Proverbialist, 1817.
- Cautions to Continental Travellers, 1818.
- Two volumes of sermons, 1822–4, and other separate sermons.

== Family ==
On 30 July 1805 Cunningham married, firstly, Sophia, daughter of Robert Williams of Moor Park, Surrey, who died in 1821. They had nine children together; the eldest son, Charles Thornton Cunningham, was lieutenant-governor of Saint Kitts from 1839 till his death in 1847.

In June 1827 Cunningham married, secondly, Mary, daughter of Harry Calvert, and sister of Sir Harry Verney, who died in 1849. By her he had three children, of whom Henry Stewart Cunningham was a judge in Bengal, and Mary Richenda married James Fitzjames Stephen, judge of the high court of justice.
