= Bishop of Limerick, Ardfert and Aghadoe =

The Bishop of Limerick, Ardfert and Aghadoe was the Ordinary of the Church of Ireland diocese of Limerick, Ardfert and Aghadoe, which was in the Province of Cashel until 1833, then afterwards in the Province of Dublin.

== History ==
The title was formed by the union of the see of Limerick and the see of Ardfert and Aghadoe in 1661. The united see consisted of most of County Limerick, all of County Kerry and a small part of County Cork. The bishop's seat (Cathedra) was located at the Cathedral Church of St Mary, Limerick. In 1976, Limerick, Ardfert and Aghadoe combined with Killaloe and Clonfert to form the united see of Limerick and Killaloe. This area, however, still has its own discrete officer, the Archdeacon of Limerick, Ardfert and Aghadoe: currently Simon Lumby.

== List of bishops ==
Bishops of Limerick, Ardfert and Aghadoe
From	Until	Incumbent	Notes
1661	1663	Edward Synge	Nominated bishop of Limerick on 6 August 1660 and consecrated 27 January 1661; later in 1661 he became bishop of Limerick, Ardfert and Aghadoe when the sees were united; translated to Cork, Cloyne and Ross on 21 December 1663
1664	1667	William Fuller	Nominated 4 March and consecrated 20 March 1664; translated to Lincoln in September 1667
1667	1673	Francis Marsh	Nominated 27 September and consecrated 22 December 1667; translated to Kilmore and Ardagh 10 January 1673
1673	1679	John Vesey	Appointed by letters patent 11 January and consecrated 22 December 1673; translated to Tuam 18 March 1679
1679	1692	Simon Digby	Nominated 24 January and consecrated 23 March 1679; translated to Elphin 12 January 1692
1692	1695	Nathanael Wilson	Nominated 7 December 1691 and consecrated 8 May 1692; died of apoplexy on 3 November 1695, supposedly to have been caused by a fall from his horse in Dublin; buried at Christ Church Cathedral, Dublin
1695	1725	Thomas Smyth	Nominated 15 November and consecrated 8 December 1695; died 4 May 1725
1725	1755	William Burscough	Nominated 29 May and consecrated 20 June 1725; died circa 3 April 1755
1755	1770	James Leslie	Nominated 30 September and consecrated 16 November 1755; died 24 November 1770
1770	1771	John Averell	Nominated 14 December 1770 and consecrated 6 January 1771; died 14 September 1771; also recorded as John Averill
1772	1784	William Gore	Translated from Elphin; nominated 27 January 1772 and appointed by letters patent 5 March 1772; died 25 February 1784
1784	1794	William Cecil Pery	Translated from Killala and Achonry; nominated 29 April 1784 and appointed by letters patent 13 May 1784; also was created Baron Glentworth in 1790; died 4 July 1794
1794	1806	Thomas Barnard	Translated from Killaloe and Kilfenora; nominated in August 1794 and appointed by letters patent 12 September 1794; died 7 June 1806
1806	1820	Charles Mongan Warburton	Nominated 28 June 1806 and consecrated 12 July 1806; translated to Cloyne 18 September 1820
1820	1822	Thomas Elrington	Nominated 1 September and consecrated 8 October 1820; translated to Ferns and Leighlin 21 December 1822
1823	1833	John Jebb	Nominated 26 November 1822 and consecrated 12 January 1823; died 9 December 1833.
1834	1849	Edmund Knox	Translated from Killaloe and Kilfenora; nominated 18 December 1833 and appointed by letters patent 29 January 1834; died 3 May 1849
1849	1853	William Higgin	Nominated 21 May and consecrated 15 July 1849; translated to Derry 7 December 1853
1854	1866	Henry Griffin	Nominated 18 November 1853 and consecrated 1 January 1854; died 5 April 1866
1866	1899	Charles Graves	Nominated 14 April and consecrated 29 June 1866; died 17 July 1899
1899	1907	Thomas Bunbury	Elected 6 October and consecrated 1 November 1899; died 19 January 1907
1907	1920	Raymond d’Audemar Orpen	Elected 28 February and consecrated 2 April 1907; resigned 31 December 1920; died 9 January 1930.
1921	1933	Harry Vere White	Formerly Dean of Christ Church, Dublin; elected 20 September and consecrated 18 October 1921; resigned 31 October 1933; died 20 January 1941.
1934	1942	Charles King Irwin	Elected 12 December 1933 and consecrated 2 February 1934; translated to Down, Connor and Dromore 6 August 1942
1942	1960	Evelyn Charles Hodges	Formerly a Canon of St Patrick's Cathedral, Dublin; elected 17 November and consecrated 2 February 1942; resigned 30 September 1960
1961	1970	Robert Wyse Jackson	Formerly Dean of Cashel; elected 2 November 1960 and consecrated 6 January 1961; resigned 12 July 1970
1970	1976	Donald Arthur Richard Caird	Elected 31 July, consecrated 29 September and enthroned 13 October 1970; translated to Meath and Kildare 9 September 1976
Since 1976, the see has been part of the united bishopric of Limerick and Killaloe
