= Embley (school) =

Coeducational independent day and boarding school located in Embley Park in Wellow

Coordinates: 50°59′08″N 1°32′34″W

- Wellow, Hampshire

Information
- Type: Private school
- Religious affiliation: Church of England
- Department for Education URN: 116515 Tables
- Head teacher: Cliff Canning
- Staff: c. 200
- Gender: Coeducational
- Age: 2 to 18
- Enrolment: 717
- Colours: Green gold and navy
- Affiliation: United Church Schools Trust
- Website: embley.org.uk

Embley School (formerly Hampshire Collegiate School) is a private co-educational day and boarding school for pupils aged 2 to 18 located in Embley Park in Wellow (near Romsey), Hampshire, England. It is part of the United Church Schools Trust.

== History ==
In 1946, Embley Park (the former family home of Florence Nightingale) became a boarding school for boys between the ages of 11 and 18. In 1996, the school joined with an all-girls school based in Romsey, formerly known as La Sagesse Convent. It then consisted of a junior school (ages 3–11), a senior school (ages 11–16), and a sixth-form college (ages 16–18).

In 2006, the school underwent another merger, with The Atherley School, a girls' school in Southampton which had been set up in 1926 by the Church Schools Company, later the United Church Schools Trust. The new school was named Hampshire Collegiate School. An investment of £14 million expanded the senior school, and created a new junior school. In 2019, the school was renamed Embley.
