= Wellow, Hampshire =

Village and parish in Hampshire, England

Coordinates: 50°58′30″N 1°34′41″W

Wellow
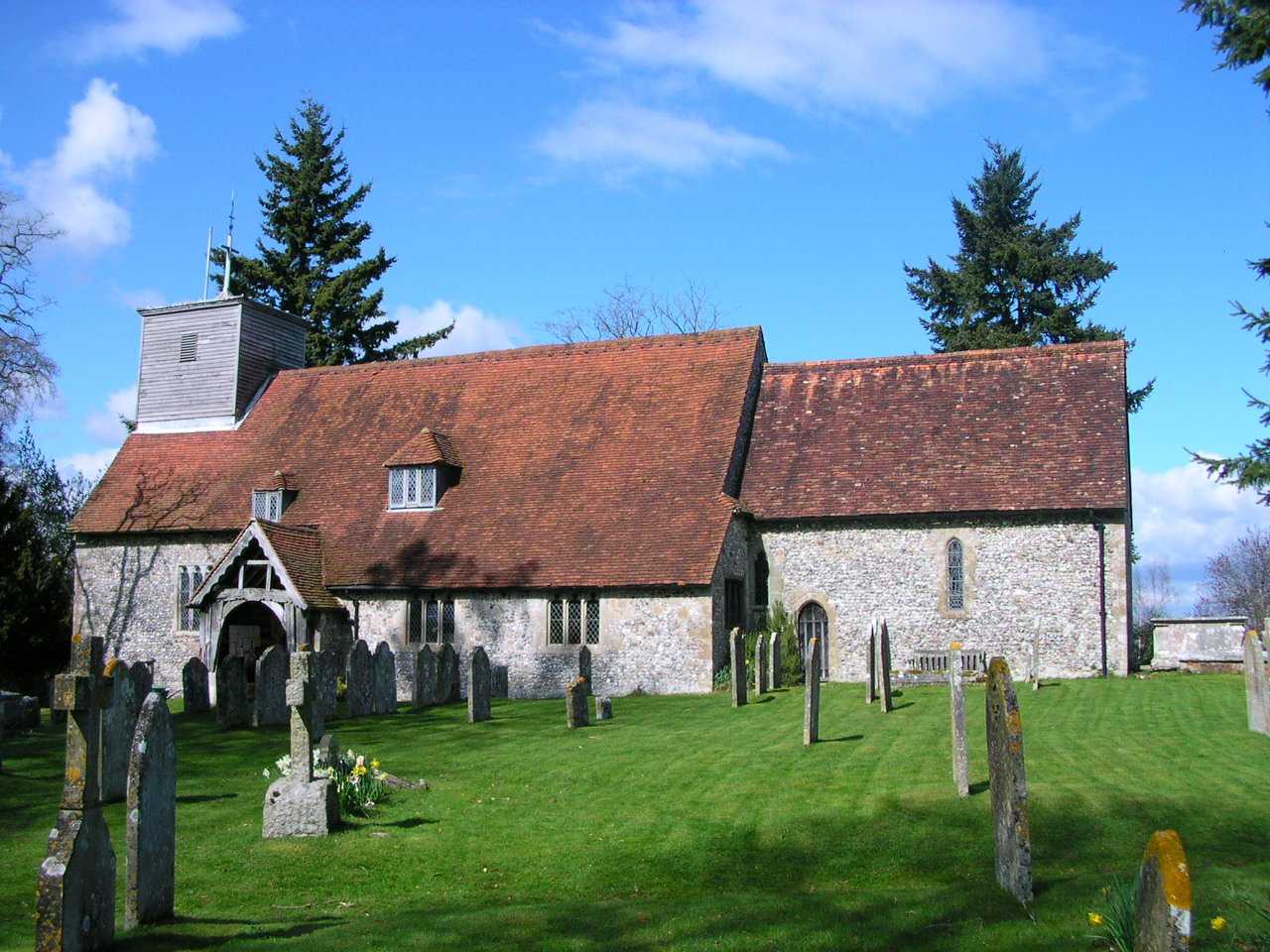
- St Margaret's Church

- Location within Hampshire
- Population: 3,239 (2021 Census: Parish of Wellow, Hampshire)
  - London: 73 miles NE
- Civil parish: Wellow
- District: Test Valley
- Shire county: Hampshire
- Region: South East
- Country: England
- Sovereign state: United Kingdom
- Post town: ROMSEY
- Postcode district: SO51
- Dialling code: 01794
- Police: Hampshire and Isle of Wight
- Fire: Hampshire and Isle of Wight
- Ambulance: South Central
- UK Parliament: Romsey and Southampton North

Wellow is a civil parish in Hampshire, England that falls within the Test Valley district. The villages lies just outside the New Forest, across the main A36 road which runs from the M27 motorway to Salisbury. The nearest town is Romsey, 4 miles (6.4 km) to the east, and the closest city is Southampton, 9 miles (14 km) to the southeast. The parish had a population of 3,239 in the 2021 census.

Some people refer to the two villages of East Wellow and West Wellow individually, while others refer to them collectively as Wellow. There is no official administrative or political division which separates the two parts, and they share the same parish council, which also covers the small settlement of Canada. Canada is just inside the New Forest boundary and can only be reached by public road from the roundabout on the A36 at West Wellow.

== History ==
King Alfred (d. 899) left "the toune of Welewe" in his will to his eldest daughter Ethelgifu. Thirteen households at "Welue" are mentioned in Domesday Book (1086).

Only the name "Wellow" appears on Saxton's 1575 map of Hampshire; it is spelt "Wellew" in various maps from the seventeenth century. East and West Wellow appear separately by the time of John Harrison's 1788 map, separated by the River Blackwater. Their exact positions on these early maps are hard to reconcile with the modern road and settlement pattern, but until 1895 when the county boundary was realigned, West Wellow was in Wiltshire and East Wellow in Hampshire.

== Amenities ==
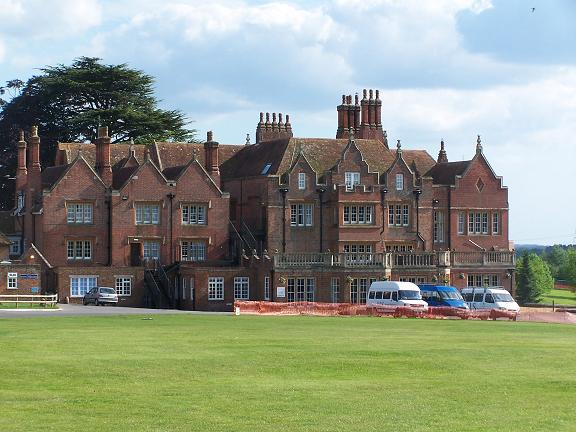
Embley, in Embley Park, was the family home of Florence Nightingale

Most of the current housing dates from the twentieth century, with a few earlier buildings (notably some thatched cottages). There is continuing small-scale infill development. All the principal services are found in the larger West Wellow and include some small shops, a petrol station, village hall, recreation ground and Wellow School. The school was originally funded by money from Florence Nightingale's family and bears a plaque recording that information.

The smaller mainly residential East Wellow is approximately one mile to the south-east of West Wellow. Throughout the 1990s, there was discussion of various options for the construction of a Wellow bypass route to relieve the village of the increasing volume of traffic on the A36; but none of these were constructed. The northern boundary of the modern village is effectively the River Blackwater, and the surrounding area is agricultural.

The former Wellow Mill on the Blackwater was served by a complicated series of sluices to deal with changes in water level but was converted to a private residence in 1945, and no machinery remains. Along the river are a series of lakes which form the site of Woodington and Whinwhistle fisheries.

== Church ==
The parish church of St. Margaret of Antioch is a flint-faced stone structure consecrated in 1215, and the interior contains some wall paintings from this period. Archaeological evidence suggests the site was previously home to a Saxon church and its possible that one of the arches in the chancel dates to around 1180.

In 1251 Henry III of England granted a charter to Wellow to hold an annual fair on the eve of St Margaret's Day. A chancel was added in the 13th century and a south aisle in the 15th. A number of internal fittings come from a now demolished church at Sherfield English from where they were moved in 1860.

The church is notable as the burial site of Florence Nightingale, whose family home was the nearby Embley Park, now a private school. St Margaret's is a destination for many visitors interested in Nightingale and the history of nursing. The church is some distance from the majority of the modern housing, and there is no archaeological evidence that there was ever a substantial settlement close to the church.

== Education ==
=== State-funded schools ===
- Wellow Primary School

=== Independent schools ===
- Embley
