= Stephen baronets =

Set index for Stephen baronets

There have been two baronetcies created for persons with the surname Stephen, both in the Baronetage of the United Kingdom. Both creations are extinct.

- Stephen baronets of Montreal (1886): see Sir George Stephen, 1st Baronet (1829–1921)
- Stephen baronets of De Vere Gardens (1891)
