= Raymond Orpen =

Irish Anglican bishop (1837–1930)

The Rt Revd Raymond d’Audemar Orpen
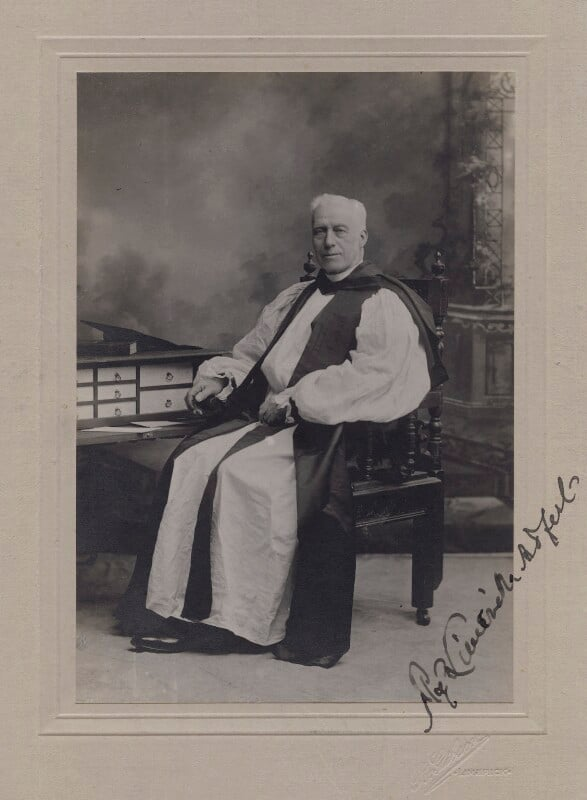
- Orpen, c. 1909

Bishop of Limerick, Ardfert and Aghadoe
- In office 1907–1921

Personal details
- Born: 31 August 1837
- Died: 9 January 1930 (aged 92)
- Spouse: Sarah née de Courcey M’Gillycuddy
- Education: Trinity College, Dublin

Raymond d’Audemar Orpen (31 August 1837 – 9 January 1930) was an Irish cleric in the 20th century.

He was a curate at Rathronan and then Adare before becoming the Incumbent of Tralee. He was Archdeacon of Ardfert until his ordination to the episcopate as Bishop of Limerick, Ardfert and Aghadoe in 1907. He retired in 1921.

In 1903 he helped to create the Guild of Witness (later the Irish Guild of Witness) with lay missionary Rosamond Stephen.

Church of Ireland titles
Preceded by Thomas Bunbury	Bishop of Limerick, Ardfert and Aghadoe; 1907–1921	Succeeded by Harry Vere White
