= Archdeacon of Ardfert =

Dioceses of the Church of Ireland
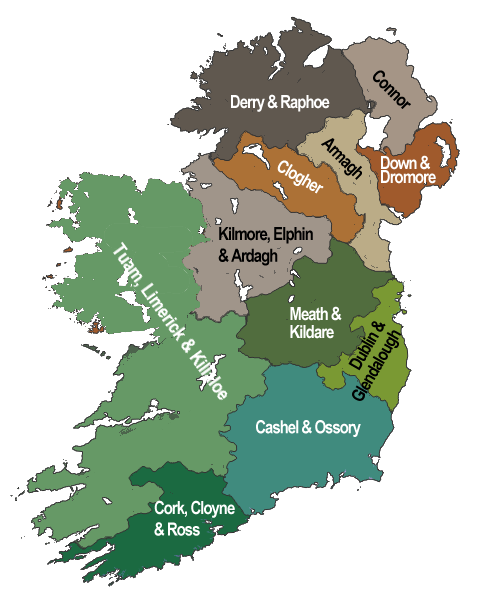
- Church: Church of Ireland
- Metropolitan bishop: Archbishop of Dublin
- Cathedral: Christ Church Cathedral, Dublin
- Dioceses: 5

The Archdeacon of Ardfert was a senior ecclesiastical officer within the Anglican Diocese of Limerick, Ardfert and Aghadoe from the early thirteenth century to the early twentieth. As such he was responsible for the disciplinary supervision of the clergy within his part of the Diocese of Ardfert (until 1666); and then the combined diocese of Limerick, Ardfert and Aghadoe.

The archdeaconry can trace its history back to Florence, who was mentioned in a document in the Christ Church Cathedral, Dublin archives as holding the office circa 1227. Two incumbents went on to hold bishoprics: John Smith (bishop of Killala and Achonry) and Raymond d’Audemar Orpen. Edward Day, Archdeacon 1782-1788, was a much-loved local figure, "a man of great erudition and unbounded benevolence". His grand-nephew Anthony Denny was also Archdeacon. The last discrete incumbent was William Foley.
