= Cashin (surname) =

Cashin is a surname of Irish origin. Notable people with the surname include:

- Alice Cashin (1870–1939), Australian nurse
- Amy Cashin (born 1994), Australian Olympic steeplechaser
- Bill Cashin (1938–2023), Irish politician
- Bonnie Cashin (1908–2000), American designer
- Eiran Cashin (born 2001), English football player
- Edward J. Cashin (1927–2007), American historian
- Fergus Cashin (1924–2005), British journalist
- Herschel V. Cashin, 20th-century American lawyer
- Michael Patrick Cashin (1864–1926), Newfoundland businessman and politician
- Norm Cashin (1915–1969), Australian rules footballer
- Pat Cashin (1968–2016), American clown and actor
- Patrick H. Cashin (1851–1926), American businessman and politician
- Peter John Cashin (1890–1977) Canadian businessman, soldier, and politician from Newfoundland
- Richard Cashin (born 1937), Canadian politician, lawyer, and trade union leader from Newfoundland
- Richard Cashin (rower) (born 1953), American rower
- Sheryll Cashin (born 1961), American law professor

== Disambiguation pages ==
- John Cashin (disambiguation)
- Robert Cashin (disambiguation)
