= Cosmo Allegretti =

American actor, artist and puppeteer (1927–2013)

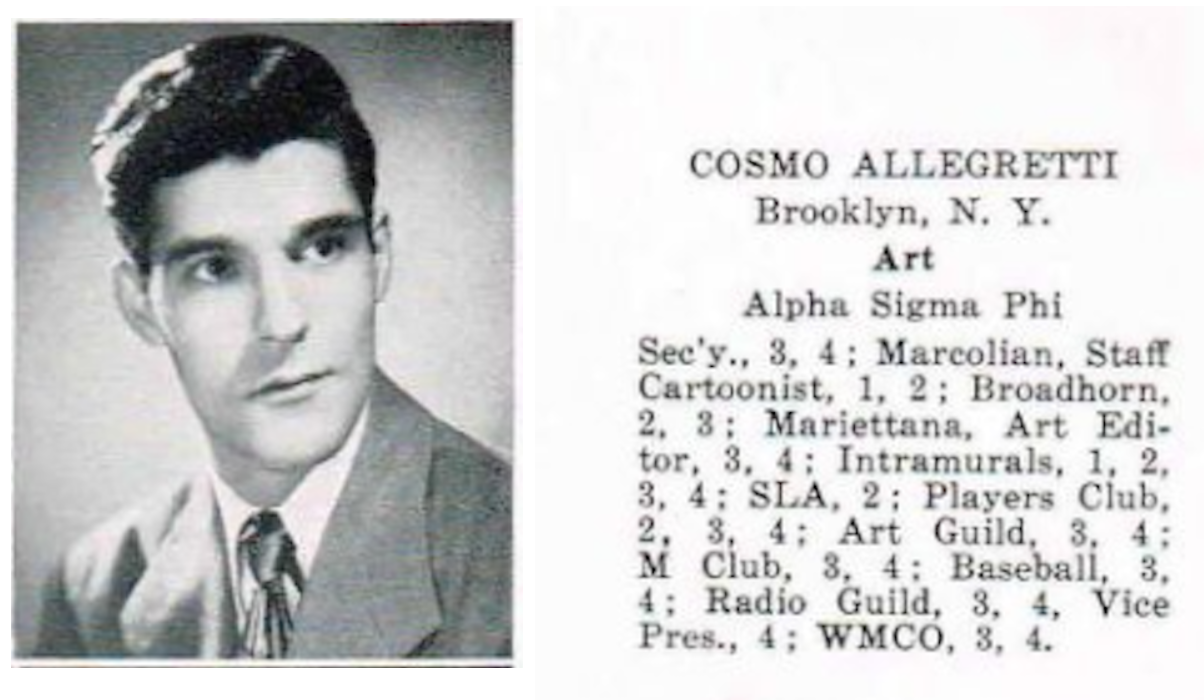

Cosmo Francis "Gus" Allegretti (April 6, 1927 – July 26, 2013) was an American artist, master puppeteer and actor. He is best known for creating and performing various puppets and roles on the children's television show, "Captain Kangaroo" which ran from October 3, 1955 to December 16, 1984, including Mr. Moose, Bunny Rabbit, Dancing Bear, Dennis the Apprentice, Grandfather Clock, Rollo Hippopotamus, Cornelius the Walrus, Mr Whispers, Word Bird, Miss Worm, Fred from Channel One, the Magic Drawing Board and many others.

== Early life ==
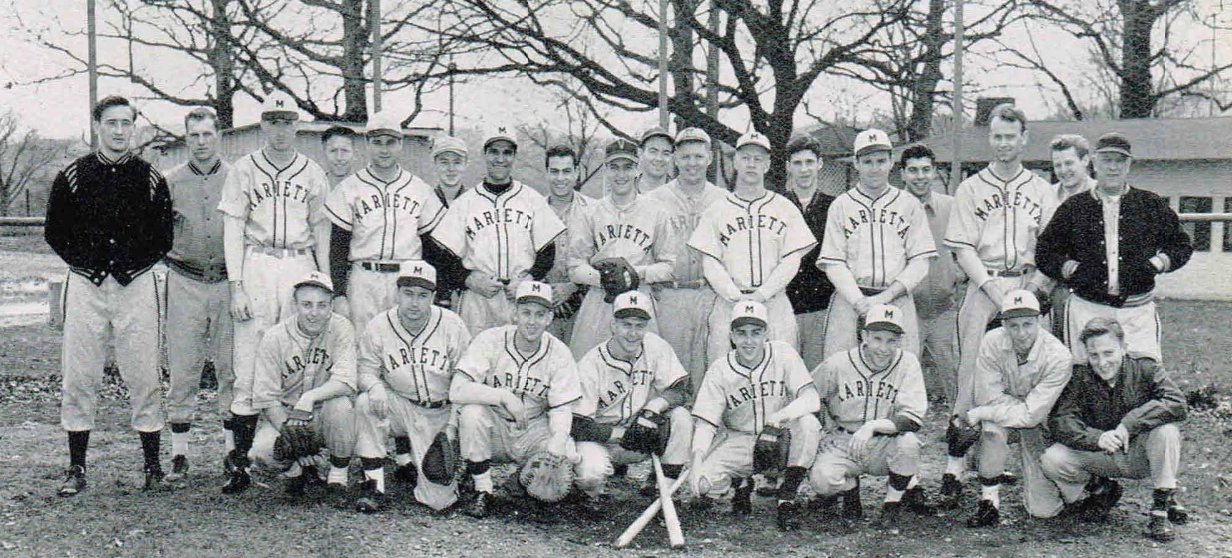
The Pioneers Baseball Team, 1951 (Allegretti is back row, 7th from left)

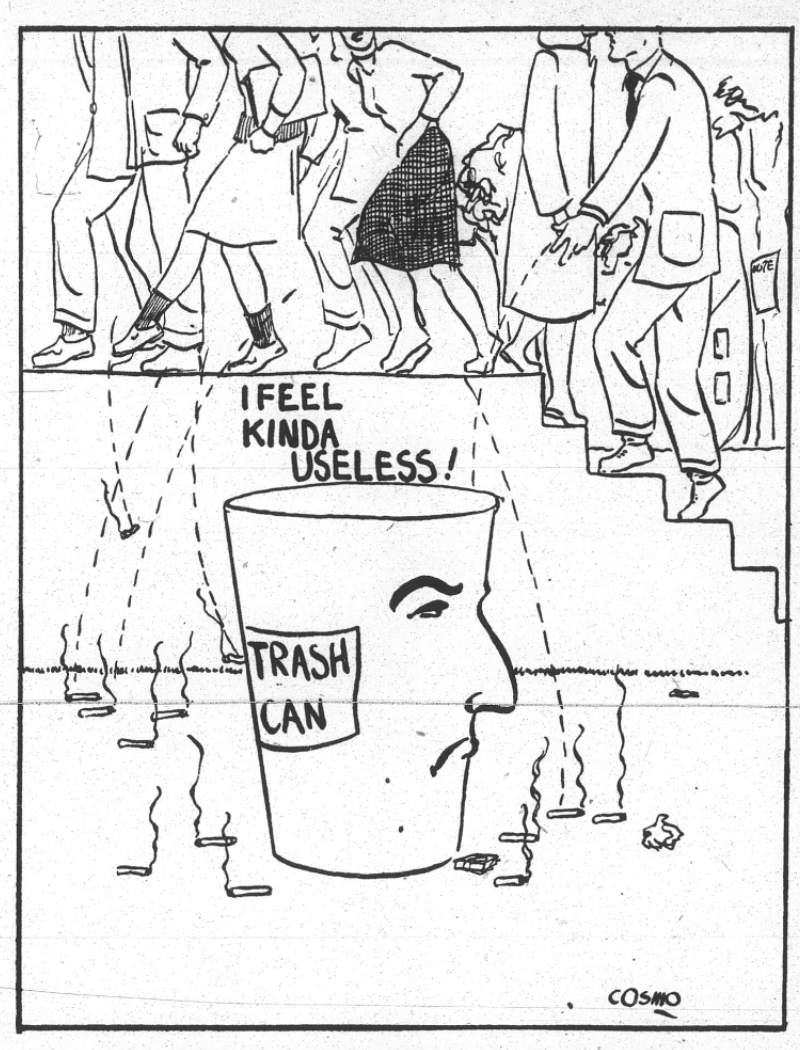
Editorial cartoon by Allegretti, regarding campus littering, from a March 4, 1949 issue of The Marcolian.

Allegretti was born to Italian immigrant parents in Greenwich Village, New York and grew up in the Avenue M neighborhood of Brooklyn, New York. His father Sergio Allegretti was a coal and ice dealer, depending on the season, and his mother, Anna Maria, was a dressmaker. Both of his parents were from Bitetto, an ancient town in the metropolitan city of Bari in Italy. The family was Roman Catholic. Allegretti had three siblings, Giuseppa/"Gussie" (b. 1924, died in infancy), Joseph (1928-1992) and Mary (1936-1948). He attended St. Augustine High School in Brooklyn. During high school, he was a star pitcher for his school's baseball team and earned the nickname "Flatbush Flash". Because of his remarkable talent at the sport, he considered trying out for the New York Dodgers after high school. But world events intervened and in 1944, he was drafted by the US Army, serving as an Army Sergeant and training to become a paratrooper during the final year of WWII. The war ended before he was deployed. He expressed disappointment to a personal friend later in life, sharing that he would have been very proud to serve his country. In 1947, he began attending Marietta College in Marietta, Ohio. While attending MC, he majored in Art, was a star pitcher for The Pioneers (Marietta College's baseball team) was the editorial cartoonist for the Marcolian student newspaper, art editor for the Mariettana Yearbook and illustrator for a student-run magazine, The Broadhorn. Additionally he was a member of Alpha Sigma Phi, the Art Guild, the Players Club (theater), and the Radio Guild for the campus station WMCO. He acted on stage in several plays with the Marietta College Drama Department, including as Mr. Manningham in "Angel Street", Dr. Caius in "Merry Wives of Windsor" and Careless in "School for Scandal".

== Television career ==
From 1950-1954, Allegretti served as a vital assistant puppeteer for the children's television program,The Rootie Kazootie Club, which aired on both NBC and ABC. He began on the show as an organist during rehearsals, but when the producers heard his convincing imitation of a dog's bark, they were impressed enough to add him to the puppeteering staff. "I became an actor because I could bark," Allegretti said, "I let out a few 'yips' for our dog puppet during a show. Steven Carlin overheard me and wanted to know if I could bark dialogue." Working behind the scenes alongside head puppeteers Paul Ashley, Michael King and Frank Milano, Allegretti helped operate the show’s secondary characters and crowd scenes, performing beneath the stage to manipulate the hand puppets.

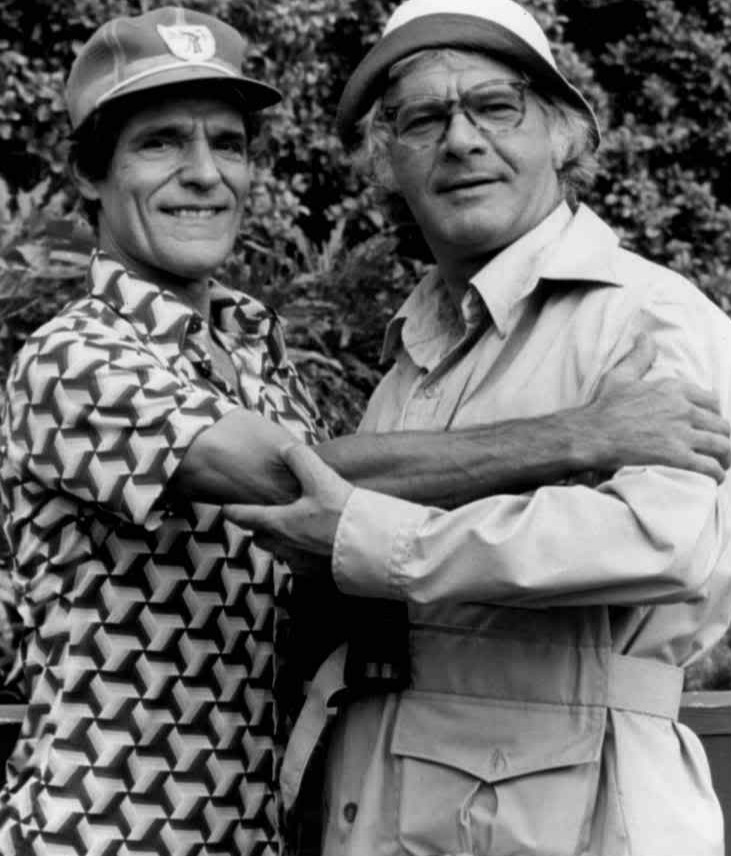
Cosmo Allegretti (Left) with comedian Dick Shawn in a May 6, 1977 photo.

While working on "Rootie Kazootie" at ABC, Allegretti became friends with producer Bob Claver, who was developing a new show with Bob Keeshan. He recommended Allegretti to Keeshan. Keeshan later stated, "We interviewed Gus in a room at the Warwick Hotel, which housed our temporary offices. I suppose the producer and I were pretty demanding in what we were looking for, and we asked some pointed questions. I liked Gus, but I remember inquiring if he really wanted to work on another children's show. At the time, Gus was working as an illustrator for a retail company (JC Penney)--a job he hated--but it was clear he was going to work on his terms or not at all."

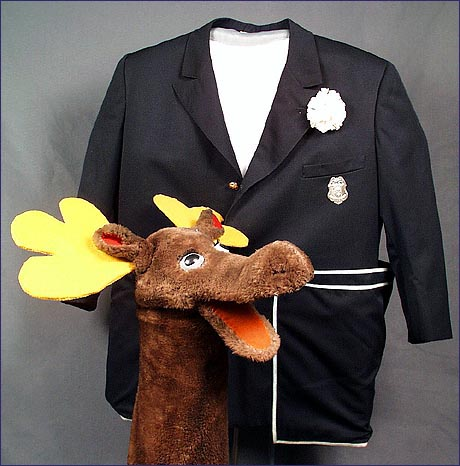
Allegretti's most popular and recognizable character from Captain Kangaroo, Mr. Moose.

Along with Hugh "Lumpy" Brannum (aka Mr Greenjeans), Allegretti joined Bob Keeshan for what would end up being a 29 year career, first as a set painter, then as master puppeteer for the "Captain Kangaroo" show. The transition to puppeteer happened when the staff was less than thrilled with a new Moose puppet that had been made by a professional for the show. Allegretti, with his art and cartooning background, offered to make a new version of the puppet, which was instantly approved and became the Mr. Moose with whom audiences are familiar. In addition to helping create several puppets including Mr. Moose and Bunny Rabbit, Allegretti also performed in costume as Rollo the Hippopotamus, Cornelius the Walrus and Dancing Bear. Mr. Moose is probably the most widely recognized of these characters, entertaining generations of children by showering the unsuspecting Captain with dozens of ping pong balls, usually triggered by a knock knock joke, a rhyme or a riddle. Bunny Rabbit is also a favorite, always tricking the Captain into giving him a fresh bunch of carrots, complete with greens.

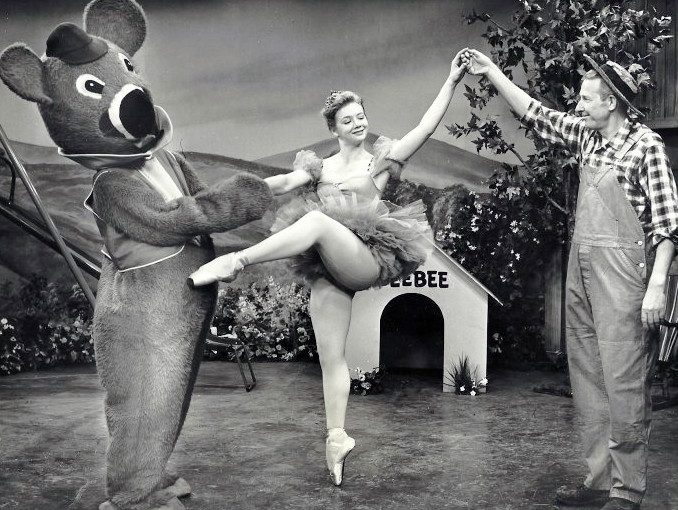
Cosmo as Dancing Bear on "Captain Kangaroo". Photo from a 1960 episode with dancer Roberta Lubell and Hugh Brannum(Mr. Greenjeans).

About Dancing Bear, Keeshan recalled "There was speculation and rumor about who is 'inside the bear'" but it was always Gus Allegretti. "We made a record album a few years after the show went on the air with a song about a dancing bear. We tried to think of how we could provide an interesting video production of the record, and one writer said, 'How about we get this big bear suit and...' All eyes in the room turned to Gus. After some genuine resistance, Gus agreed to try it. The suit was fashioned, Gus climbed in and performed to 'The Dancing Bear'. That was nice, we all said, and forgot about it. Then the postman rang once, then twice, then once again, and the mail poured in. People loved the bear. More songs and some skits were written for him, and Gus found himself with another hot character, in this case, literally."

He also performed all segments of the "Magic Drawing Board", dressed all in black behind the screen, drawing in reverse to accompany stories the Captain would tell. He also created hundreds of cardboard cut-out puppets over the years for the show that would dance (with Allegretti puppeteering) to various story songs, such as "The Big Rock Candy Mountain" and "The Horse in Striped Pajamas". In the final decade of the show, Allegretti was seen on screen as "Dennis the Apprentice", an assistant to Brannum's "Mr. Bainter the Painter" character. Dennis had a childlike innocence and "asks the Captain the kinds of questions a child would ask, disarming, well-meant questions." In addition to Dennis, Allegretti himself played many other roles on the show in various skits, alongside Brannum, Keeshan, James Wall, Carolyn Mignoni, Kevin Clash, Debbie Weems and a plethora of celebrity guest stars.

Allegretti performed on several "Captain Kangaroo" records for Peter Pan Records, Chelsea Records, 51 West Records and more in character as Mr. Moose, Cornelius the Walrus and others. He also sang many other songs not related to his Captain Kangaroo characters.

Of his time on the show, Allegretti said, "The essential ingredients were warmth and kindness. Kangaroo was a visit, not a show. Keeshan was looking to go against the grain, to do a quiet, gentle show when the others were loud. I give him enormous credit for sticking to his guns."

In addition to his roles on Captain Kangaroo, Allegretti also performed on an additional short lived Bob Keeshan program, Mr. Mayor, which ran on Saturday mornings from September 26,1964 to September 18,1965.

In 1985, he also appeared as Thomas White Mountain for three episodes of the daytime serial "Another World".

== Filmography ==
=== Film ===
Year	Film	Role	Notes
1977	Sorceror	Carlo Ricci	Starring Roy Scheider
1981	Prince of the City	Marcel Sardino	Starring Treat Williams
1982	Author, Author	Fippsy Fippininni	Starring Al Pacino
1990	Street Hunter	Mafia Don at Coffin Factory	with John Leguizamo

=== Television ===
Year	Program	Role	Notes
1950-1954	Rootie Kazootie	Puppeteer	Various puppets
1955-1984	Captain Kangaroo	Master Puppeteer, Actor, Artist, Set Painter	Mr. Moose, Bunny Rabbit, Grandfather Clock, Dancing Bear, Miss Frog, Miss Worm, Word Bird, Dennis the Apprentice, Rollo Hippopotamus, Cornelius the Walrus, Bernard the Very Large Dog, Fred from Channel One (Aniforms puppet), Magic Drawing Board, Harley the Clown, Mr. Lion, Mr. Whispers and others
1964-1965	Mr Mayor	Puppeteer, Actor	Rollo the Hippopotamus, Cornelius the Walrus, Russell Duck, Mr. & Mrs. Frog, Herman Homan and others

=== Theatre ===
Year	Stage Production	Role	Notes
1958	Guests of the Nation	Bonaparte, IRA Member	Official stage debut, Off Broadway
1985	Requiem for a Heavyweight	Perelli	Broadway debut
1982	Crazy from the Heart	Lawrence, Jicarilla Apache	Yale Repertory Theater, Winterfest 6

== Personal life ==
Allegretti was married to Broadway actress Carol Lawrence from 1956-1959. They wed on January 7, 1956 after a brief courtship. The marriage was annulled in 1959.

He married Hungarian model Ibolya Korody in 1960. The marriage ended in divorce.

== Later life and death ==
In the mid-2000s, Allegretti was diagnosed with emphysema, and retired to Phoenix, Arizona on doctor's recommendations. He died on July 26, 2013 and was cremated, his ashes scattered in the Arizona desert.

== Legacy ==
Many puppeteers, including those who worked on Captain Kangaroo and went on to develop characters on Sesame Street and other programs, were inspired and influenced by Allegretti. He was a television and puppetry pioneer, whose characters entertained generations of children, from 1950 on.

On Allegretti's Facebook tribute page, one fan commented, "Never did a man live up to his surname more so than this gentleman, so formative of my world. The little happy ones, indeed. Gus was the Admiral behind the Captain!"

A scholarship fund was established at Marietta College by Allegretti's estate following his death. It is awarded to an incoming freshman student with a grade point average of 3.0 and a major in a course of study in the Art Department. The scholarship is renewable annually provided the recipient maintains at least a 2.6 cumulative grade point average and continues to make satisfactory progress toward an undergraduate degree.
