= Crystal Tipps and Alistair =

British TV cartoon series (1972–1974)

- Genre: Cartoon
- Written by: Graham McCallum and Hilary Hayton
- Directed by: Richard Taylor
- Composer: Paul Reade
- Country of origin: United Kingdom
- No. of episodes: 50

Production
- Producer: Michael Grafton-Robinson
- Animators: Althea Battams and Maggie Clarke
- Running time: Five minutes
- Production company: Q3 London

Original release
- Network: BBC One
- Release: 28 February 1972 – 1974

Crystal Tipps and Alistair is a British cartoon produced for the BBC. The main series aired between 28 February 1972 and 1974 on BBC One.

The cartoon began as an entry to a European Broadcasting Union (EBU) collaborative project seeking wholly dialogue-free animations. The resulting 5-minute film, titled Hide and Seek, aired in 1971 and became the pilot for the series.

The series has no dialogue but is accompanied by a full musical soundtrack composed by Paul Reade. However, when shown on Captain Kangaroo in the U.S. in the 1970s the series did have voice-over narration by Cosmo Allegretti in his high-pitched "Mr. Moose" voice.

== Characters ==
The title characters are a girl who is called Crystal Tipps and her dog who are joined by their friends Birdie and Butterfly.

== Broadcast ==
In addition to the pilot, there are 50 five-minute episodes and a 20-minute Christmas special, all first shown between 1972 and 1974. It was regularly repeated until 1980. Between 1985 and 1987 the programme aired on Children's ITV (with its BBC TV/Q3 credit replaced by a "Children's ITV" endboard on the 4pm broadcast). In 1990, the BBC claimed back the rights with continued airings until 1994. It was created by Hilary Hayton and Graham McCallum. Michael Grafton-Robinson, a BBC producer went independent, setting up Q3 of London to produce the series. The animation was done by Richard Taylor Cartoons, who were also contracted to make the Charley Says and the Protect and Survive public information films for the Central Office of Information.

== Episodes ==
=== Pilot (1971) ===
Title	Original release date
"Hide and Seek"	10 June 1971

=== Series (1972-1974) ===
No.	Title	Original release date
1	"Bird"	28 February 1972
2	"Butterfly"	29 February 1972
3	"Flying"	1 March 1972
4	"The Art Gallery"	2 March 1972
5	"Keep Fit"	3 March 1972
6	"Fishing"	6 March 1972
7	"Party Time"	7 March 1972
8	"Decorating"	8 March 1972
9	"Sowing Seeds"	9 March 1972
10	"Trip to the Seaside"	10 March 1972
11	"Yo Yo"	13 March 1972
12	"The Postman"	14 March 1972
13	"Dressing Up"	15 March 1972
14	"Music Makers"	16 March 1972
15	"Snow"	17 March 1972
16	"It's Quicker by Tube"	20 March 1972
17	"Zoo Time"	21 March 1972
18	"Spring Cleaning"	22 March 1972
19	"Boots"	23 March 1972
20	"Chimney Sweep"	24 March 1972
21	"The Circus"	27 March 1972
22	"On Wheels"	28 March 1972
23	"Tennis Time"	29 March 1972
24	"The Swimming Pool"	30 March 1972
25	"Picnic Time"	unknown
26	"Surprise"	unknown
27	"Bubbles"	unknown
28	"Pussy"	unknown
29	"Gardening"	unknown
30	"Still Life"	unknown
31	"Sailing"	unknown
32	"Golf"	unknown
33	"Waterworks"	unknown
34	"Eastern Magic"	unknown
35	"Dough"	unknown
36	"The Fortune Teller"	unknown
37	"The Monster"	unknown
38	"Hotel"	unknown
39	"The Dog House"	unknown
40	"Trampoline"	unknown
41	"Knitting"	unknown
42	"Bump in the Night"	unknown
43	"Vacuum Cleaner"	unknown
44	"Professor"	unknown
45	"Cricket"	unknown
46	"Kitten Care"	unknown
47	"The Farm"	unknown
48	"Sculptures"	unknown
49	"Topiary"	unknown
50	"The Magician"	unknown

=== Christmas Special (1974) ===
Title	Original release date
"Crystal's Christmas Special"	25 December 1974

== Credits ==
- Designed and Written by: Graham McCallum and Hilary Hayton
- Music Composed by: Paul Reade
- Animation Directed by: Richard Taylor
- Animators: Althea Battams and Maggie Clarke
- Produced by: Michael Grafton-Robinson
- A BBC TV/Q3 London Co-Production
