= 1936 VFL season =

40th season of the Victorian Football League (VFL)

1936 VFL premiership season
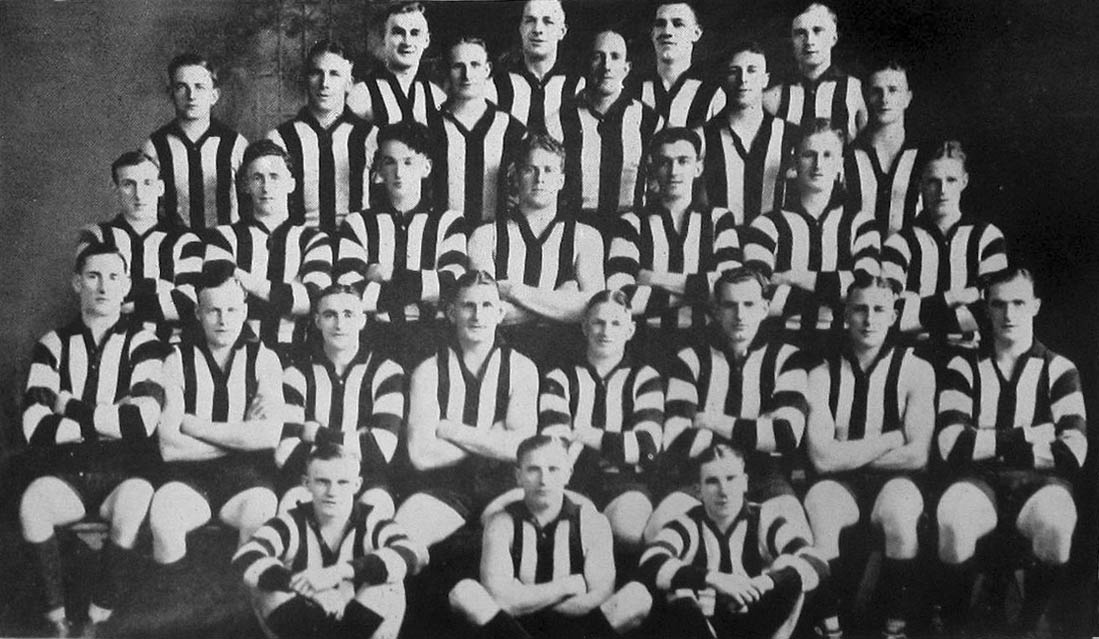
- Collingwood Football Club, premier team
- Teams: 12
- Premiers: Collingwood; 11th premiership
- Minor premiers: South Melbourne; 5th minor premiership
- Brownlow Medallist: Denis Ryan (Fitzroy)
- Bill Mohr (St Kilda)
- Matches played: 112
- Highest: 74,091

The 1936 VFL season was the 40th season of the Victorian Football League (VFL), the highest level senior Australian rules football competition in Victoria. The season featured twelve clubs, ran from 2 May until 3 October, and comprised an 18-game home-and-away season followed by a finals series featuring the top four clubs.

The premiership was won by the Collingwood Football Club for the eleventh time and second time consecutively, after it defeated South Melbourne by eleven points in the 1936 VFL grand final.

== Background ==
In 1936, the VFL competition consisted of twelve teams of 18 on-the-field players each, plus one substitute player, known as the 19th man. A player could be substituted for any reason; however, once substituted, a player could not return to the field of play under any circumstances.

Teams played each other in a home-and-away season of 18 rounds; matches 12 to 18 were the "home-and-way reverse" of matches 1 to 7.

Once the 18 round home-and-away season had finished, the 1936 VFL Premiers were determined by the specific format and conventions of the Page–McIntyre system.

== Home-and-away season ==
=== Round 1 ===
| Home team | Home team score | Away team | Away team score | Venue | Crowd | Date |
|---|---|---|---|---|---|---|
| Richmond | 15.17 (107) | St Kilda | 17.4 (106) | Punt Road Oval | 27,000 | 2 May 1936 |
| Essendon | 17.15 (117) | North Melbourne | 11.4 (70) | Windy Hill | 15,000 | 2 May 1936 |
| South Melbourne | 14.24 (108) | Melbourne | 13.9 (87) | Lake Oval | 22,000 | 2 May 1936 |
| Geelong | 20.24 (144) | Footscray | 10.9 (69) | Corio Oval | 12,000 | 2 May 1936 |
| Hawthorn | 12.11 (83) | Collingwood | 15.14 (104) | Glenferrie Oval | 14,000 | 2 May 1936 |
| Fitzroy | 13.9 (87) | Carlton | 24.19 (163) | Brunswick Street Oval | 32,000 | 2 May 1936 |

=== Round 2 ===
| Home team | Home team score | Away team | Away team score | Venue | Crowd | Date |
|---|---|---|---|---|---|---|
| St Kilda | 10.11 (71) | South Melbourne | 12.17 (89) | Junction Oval | 30,000 | 9 May 1936 |
| Footscray | 8.20 (68) | Hawthorn | 11.7 (73) | Western Oval | 10,000 | 9 May 1936 |
| Collingwood | 16.12 (108) | Richmond | 10.12 (72) | Victoria Park | 26,500 | 9 May 1936 |
| Carlton | 21.19 (145) | Essendon | 5.13 (43) | Princes Park | 25,000 | 9 May 1936 |
| North Melbourne | 9.14 (68) | Geelong | 11.8 (74) | Arden Street Oval | 9,000 | 9 May 1936 |
| Melbourne | 15.17 (107) | Fitzroy | 8.11 (59) | MCG | 16,245 | 9 May 1936 |

=== Round 3 ===
| Home team | Home team score | Away team | Away team score | Venue | Crowd | Date |
|---|---|---|---|---|---|---|
| Geelong | 14.18 (102) | Melbourne | 4.8 (32) | Corio Oval | 12,000 | 16 May 1936 |
| Essendon | 16.19 (115) | St Kilda | 18.11 (119) | Windy Hill | 18,000 | 16 May 1936 |
| Richmond | 13.14 (92) | North Melbourne | 6.17 (53) | Punt Road Oval | 14,000 | 16 May 1936 |
| South Melbourne | 15.17 (107) | Footscray | 9.13 (67) | Lake Oval | 18,000 | 16 May 1936 |
| Fitzroy | 12.12 (84) | Collingwood | 25.14 (164) | Brunswick Street Oval | 20,000 | 16 May 1936 |
| Hawthorn | 14.13 (97) | Carlton | 16.11 (107) | Glenferrie Oval | 18,000 | 16 May 1936 |

=== Round 4 ===
| Home team | Home team score | Away team | Away team score | Venue | Crowd | Date |
|---|---|---|---|---|---|---|
| North Melbourne | 7.18 (60) | South Melbourne | 18.21 (129) | Arden Street Oval | 14,000 | 23 May 1936 |
| Collingwood | 20.17 (137) | Essendon | 13.10 (88) | Victoria Park | 11,000 | 23 May 1936 |
| Carlton | 16.19 (115) | Richmond | 18.17 (125) | Princes Park | 43,000 | 23 May 1936 |
| Melbourne | 16.20 (116) | Hawthorn | 11.11 (77) | MCG | 10,152 | 23 May 1936 |
| St Kilda | 19.11 (125) | Geelong | 12.10 (82) | Junction Oval | 22,500 | 23 May 1936 |
| Footscray | 13.11 (89) | Fitzroy | 10.14 (74) | Western Oval | 18,000 | 23 May 1936 |

=== Round 5 ===
| Home team | Home team score | Away team | Away team score | Venue | Crowd | Date |
|---|---|---|---|---|---|---|
| Fitzroy | 17.19 (121) | Geelong | 17.13 (115) | Brunswick Street Oval | 10,000 | 30 May 1936 |
| Collingwood | 16.17 (113) | St Kilda | 9.14 (68) | Victoria Park | 28,000 | 30 May 1936 |
| North Melbourne | 11.9 (75) | Melbourne | 17.20 (122) | Arden Street Oval | 8,000 | 30 May 1936 |
| Richmond | 16.21 (117) | Hawthorn | 10.12 (72) | Punt Road Oval | 9,000 | 30 May 1936 |
| South Melbourne | 15.21 (111) | Essendon | 11.13 (79) | Lake Oval | 15,000 | 30 May 1936 |
| Footscray | 7.17 (59) | Carlton | 13.16 (94) | Western Oval | 15,000 | 30 May 1936 |

=== Round 6 ===
| Home team | Home team score | Away team | Away team score | Venue | Crowd | Date |
|---|---|---|---|---|---|---|
| Hawthorn | 9.11 (65) | South Melbourne | 18.20 (128) | Glenferrie Oval | 12,000 | 6 June 1936 |
| Geelong | 6.14 (50) | Richmond | 13.12 (90) | Corio Oval | 9,000 | 6 June 1936 |
| Essendon | 18.19 (127) | Fitzroy | 12.14 (86) | Windy Hill | 14,000 | 6 June 1936 |
| Carlton | 11.16 (82) | Collingwood | 12.16 (88) | Princes Park | 46,000 | 6 June 1936 |
| St Kilda | 22.15 (147) | North Melbourne | 14.24 (108) | Junction Oval | 10,000 | 6 June 1936 |
| Melbourne | 13.18 (96) | Footscray | 11.14 (80) | MCG | 10,595 | 6 June 1936 |

=== Round 7 ===
| Home team | Home team score | Away team | Away team score | Venue | Crowd | Date |
|---|---|---|---|---|---|---|
| Collingwood | 14.5 (89) | Melbourne | 9.13 (67) | Victoria Park | 11,250 | 13 June 1936 |
| Carlton | 19.14 (128) | St Kilda | 11.9 (75) | Princes Park | 22,000 | 13 June 1936 |
| Hawthorn | 12.19 (91) | Geelong | 7.6 (48) | Glenferrie Oval | 6,000 | 13 June 1936 |
| North Melbourne | 12.19 (91) | Footscray | 13.7 (85) | Arden Street Oval | 10,000 | 13 June 1936 |
| South Melbourne | 13.15 (93) | Fitzroy | 7.11 (53) | Lake Oval | 14,000 | 13 June 1936 |
| Richmond | 10.18 (78) | Essendon | 10.11 (71) | Punt Road Oval | 12,000 | 13 June 1936 |

=== Round 8 ===
| Home team | Home team score | Away team | Away team score | Venue | Crowd | Date |
|---|---|---|---|---|---|---|
| Melbourne | 20.11 (131) | St Kilda | 15.11 (101) | MCG | 21,230 | 20 June 1936 |
| Fitzroy | 12.16 (88) | Richmond | 20.12 (132) | Brunswick Street Oval | 12,000 | 20 June 1936 |
| Essendon | 12.19 (91) | Hawthorn | 8.18 (66) | Windy Hill | 11,000 | 20 June 1936 |
| South Melbourne | 16.21 (117) | Geelong | 15.14 (104) | Lake Oval | 12,000 | 20 June 1936 |
| Footscray | 11.13 (79) | Collingwood | 16.10 (106) | Western Oval | 11,500 | 20 June 1936 |
| North Melbourne | 13.8 (86) | Carlton | 9.13 (67) | Arden Street Oval | 15,000 | 20 June 1936 |

=== Round 9 ===
| Home team | Home team score | Away team | Away team score | Venue | Crowd | Date |
|---|---|---|---|---|---|---|
| Richmond | 14.14 (98) | South Melbourne | 11.11 (77) | Punt Road Oval | 29,500 | 27 June 1936 |
| Collingwood | 17.19 (121) | North Melbourne | 8.7 (55) | Victoria Park | 11,500 | 27 June 1936 |
| Carlton | 9.14 (68) | Melbourne | 11.17 (83) | Princes Park | 18,000 | 27 June 1936 |
| St Kilda | 20.17 (137) | Footscray | 16.13 (109) | Junction Oval | 10,000 | 27 June 1936 |
| Hawthorn | 11.9 (75) | Fitzroy | 9.9 (63) | Glenferrie Oval | 8,000 | 27 June 1936 |
| Geelong | 26.18 (174) | Essendon | 14.13 (97) | Corio Oval | 8,000 | 27 June 1936 |

=== Round 10 ===
| Home team | Home team score | Away team | Away team score | Venue | Crowd | Date |
|---|---|---|---|---|---|---|
| Footscray | 10.8 (68) | Richmond | 15.13 (103) | Western Oval | 10,500 | 11 July 1936 |
| Collingwood | 12.19 (91) | South Melbourne | 14.18 (102) | Victoria Park | 25,800 | 11 July 1936 |
| Carlton | 14.21 (105) | Geelong | 12.17 (89) | Princes Park | 18,000 | 11 July 1936 |
| St Kilda | 16.9 (105) | Hawthorn | 12.16 (88) | Junction Oval | 9,000 | 11 July 1936 |
| North Melbourne | 9.11 (65) | Fitzroy | 3.12 (30) | Arden Street Oval | 9,000 | 11 July 1936 |
| Melbourne | 16.15 (111) | Essendon | 9.13 (67) | MCG | 12,357 | 11 July 1936 |

=== Round 11 ===
| Home team | Home team score | Away team | Away team score | Venue | Crowd | Date |
|---|---|---|---|---|---|---|
| Hawthorn | 8.19 (67) | North Melbourne | 7.11 (53) | Glenferrie Oval | 6,000 | 18 July 1936 |
| Fitzroy | 16.9 (105) | St Kilda | 19.15 (129) | Brunswick Street Oval | 7,000 | 18 July 1936 |
| Essendon | 12.15 (87) | Footscray | 16.18 (114) | Windy Hill | 10,000 | 18 July 1936 |
| Richmond | 15.13 (103) | Melbourne | 17.10 (112) | Punt Road Oval | 18,500 | 18 July 1936 |
| Geelong | 13.15 (93) | Collingwood | 11.9 (75) | Corio Oval | 10,000 | 18 July 1936 |
| South Melbourne | 16.11 (107) | Carlton | 14.16 (100) | Lake Oval | 26,000 | 18 July 1936 |

=== Round 12 ===
| Home team | Home team score | Away team | Away team score | Venue | Crowd | Date |
|---|---|---|---|---|---|---|
| Melbourne | 22.16 (148) | South Melbourne | 14.12 (96) | MCG | 26,510 | 25 July 1936 |
| Footscray | 14.9 (93) | Geelong | 10.22 (82) | Western Oval | 6,000 | 25 July 1936 |
| Collingwood | 14.18 (102) | Hawthorn | 6.12 (48) | Victoria Park | 7,000 | 25 July 1936 |
| Carlton | 18.15 (123) | Fitzroy | 14.11 (95) | Princes Park | 9,000 | 25 July 1936 |
| St Kilda | 14.12 (96) | Richmond | 18.6 (114) | Junction Oval | 12,000 | 25 July 1936 |
| North Melbourne | 6.14 (50) | Essendon | 10.10 (70) | Arden Street Oval | 7,000 | 25 July 1936 |

=== Round 13 ===
| Home team | Home team score | Away team | Away team score | Venue | Crowd | Date |
|---|---|---|---|---|---|---|
| Geelong | 17.20 (122) | North Melbourne | 12.8 (80) | Corio Oval | 8,000 | 1 August 1936 |
| Fitzroy | 13.13 (91) | Melbourne | 12.13 (85) | Brunswick Street Oval | 11,000 | 1 August 1936 |
| South Melbourne | 14.19 (103) | St Kilda | 13.11 (89) | Lake Oval | 16,000 | 1 August 1936 |
| Hawthorn | 13.13 (91) | Footscray | 8.21 (69) | Glenferrie Oval | 10,000 | 1 August 1936 |
| Richmond | 11.14 (80) | Collingwood | 14.12 (96) | Punt Road Oval | 26,000 | 1 August 1936 |
| Essendon | 8.11 (59) | Carlton | 17.16 (118) | Windy Hill | 13,000 | 1 August 1936 |

=== Round 14 ===
| Home team | Home team score | Away team | Away team score | Venue | Crowd | Date |
|---|---|---|---|---|---|---|
| North Melbourne | 11.7 (73) | Richmond | 9.11 (65) | Arden Street Oval | 7,000 | 8 August 1936 |
| Footscray | 11.15 (81) | South Melbourne | 12.21 (93) | Western Oval | 12,000 | 8 August 1936 |
| Collingwood | 13.12 (90) | Fitzroy | 11.8 (74) | Victoria Park | 16,400 | 8 August 1936 |
| Carlton | 11.17 (83) | Hawthorn | 8.16 (64) | Princes Park | 9,000 | 8 August 1936 |
| Melbourne | 14.16 (100) | Geelong | 15.15 (105) | MCG | 12,229 | 8 August 1936 |
| St Kilda | 16.23 (119) | Essendon | 14.14 (98) | Junction Oval | 7,500 | 8 August 1936 |

=== Round 15 ===
| Home team | Home team score | Away team | Away team score | Venue | Crowd | Date |
|---|---|---|---|---|---|---|
| Hawthorn | 9.8 (62) | Melbourne | 17.10 (112) | Glenferrie Oval | 10,000 | 15 August 1936 |
| Geelong | 18.22 (130) | St Kilda | 10.7 (67) | Corio Oval | 8,000 | 15 August 1936 |
| Fitzroy | 9.10 (64) | Footscray | 12.17 (89) | Brunswick Street Oval | 10,000 | 15 August 1936 |
| South Melbourne | 8.16 (64) | North Melbourne | 9.9 (63) | Lake Oval | 11,000 | 15 August 1936 |
| Essendon | 8.10 (58) | Collingwood | 14.16 (100) | Windy Hill | 9,000 | 15 August 1936 |
| Richmond | 9.12 (66) | Carlton | 14.6 (90) | Punt Road Oval | 25,000 | 15 August 1936 |

=== Round 16 ===
| Home team | Home team score | Away team | Away team score | Venue | Crowd | Date |
|---|---|---|---|---|---|---|
| Melbourne | 14.23 (107) | North Melbourne | 5.15 (45) | MCG | 16,103 | 22 August 1936 |
| Hawthorn | 15.12 (102) | Richmond | 14.16 (100) | Glenferrie Oval | 9,000 | 22 August 1936 |
| Essendon | 12.16 (88) | South Melbourne | 11.30 (96) | Windy Hill | 9,000 | 22 August 1936 |
| Carlton | 12.22 (94) | Footscray | 12.14 (86) | Princes Park | 15,000 | 22 August 1936 |
| Geelong | 20.21 (141) | Fitzroy | 6.8 (44) | Corio Oval | 7,000 | 22 August 1936 |
| St Kilda | 11.11 (77) | Collingwood | 14.13 (97) | Junction Oval | 14,300 | 22 August 1936 |

=== Round 17 ===
| Home team | Home team score | Away team | Away team score | Venue | Crowd | Date |
|---|---|---|---|---|---|---|
| North Melbourne | 15.7 (97) | St Kilda | 15.18 (108) | Arden Street Oval | 8,000 | 29 August 1936 |
| Footscray | 8.17 (65) | Melbourne | 9.18 (72) | Western Oval | 13,000 | 29 August 1936 |
| South Melbourne | 16.10 (106) | Hawthorn | 15.11 (101) | Lake Oval | 12,000 | 29 August 1936 |
| Richmond | 8.7 (55) | Geelong | 12.9 (81) | Punt Road Oval | 14,000 | 29 August 1936 |
| Fitzroy | 9.16 (70) | Essendon | 17.16 (118) | Brunswick Street Oval | 9,000 | 29 August 1936 |
| Collingwood | 13.11 (89) | Carlton | 13.12 (90) | Victoria Park | 30,100 | 29 August 1936 |

=== Round 18 ===
| Home team | Home team score | Away team | Away team score | Venue | Crowd | Date |
|---|---|---|---|---|---|---|
| Geelong | 21.22 (148) | Hawthorn | 9.15 (69) | Corio Oval | 6,000 | 5 September 1936 |
| Footscray | 14.8 (92) | North Melbourne | 12.10 (82) | Western Oval | 11,000 | 5 September 1936 |
| Fitzroy | 11.13 (79) | South Melbourne | 11.14 (80) | Brunswick Street Oval | 11,000 | 5 September 1936 |
| Essendon | 14.8 (92) | Richmond | 11.10 (76) | Windy Hill | 8,000 | 5 September 1936 |
| Melbourne | 9.13 (67) | Collingwood | 11.18 (84) | MCG | 21,648 | 5 September 1936 |
| St Kilda | 16.10 (106) | Carlton | 15.15 (105) | Junction Oval | 18,000 | 5 September 1936 |

== Ladder ==
| (P) | Premiers |
| | Qualified for finals |

| # | Team | P | W | L | D | PF | PA | % | Pts |
|---|---|---|---|---|---|---|---|---|---|
| 1 | South Melbourne | 18 | 16 | 2 | 0 | 1806 | 1524 | 118.5 | 64 |
| 2 | Collingwood (P) | 18 | 15 | 3 | 0 | 1854 | 1367 | 135.6 | 60 |
| 3 | Carlton | 18 | 12 | 6 | 0 | 1877 | 1504 | 124.8 | 48 |
| 4 | Melbourne | 18 | 12 | 6 | 0 | 1755 | 1477 | 118.8 | 48 |
| 5 | Geelong | 18 | 11 | 7 | 0 | 1884 | 1498 | 125.8 | 44 |
| 6 | Richmond | 18 | 10 | 8 | 0 | 1673 | 1550 | 107.9 | 40 |
| 7 | St Kilda | 18 | 9 | 9 | 0 | 1845 | 1919 | 96.1 | 36 |
| 8 | Essendon | 18 | 6 | 12 | 0 | 1565 | 1840 | 85.1 | 24 |
| 9 | Hawthorn | 18 | 6 | 12 | 0 | 1391 | 1720 | 80.9 | 24 |
| 10 | Footscray | 18 | 5 | 13 | 0 | 1462 | 1690 | 86.5 | 20 |
| 11 | North Melbourne | 18 | 4 | 14 | 0 | 1274 | 1679 | 75.9 | 16 |
| 12 | Fitzroy | 18 | 2 | 16 | 0 | 1367 | 1985 | 68.9 | 8 |

Rules for classification: 1. premiership points; 2. percentage; 3. points for
Average score: 91.4
Source: AFL Tables

== Finals series ==
=== Semi-finals ===
| Home team | Score | Away team | Score | Venue | Crowd | Date |
|---|---|---|---|---|---|---|
| Carlton | 11.22 (88) | Melbourne | 14.13 (97) | MCG | 55,094 | 12 September |
| South Melbourne | 10.17 (77) | Collingwood | 12.18 (90) | MCG | 55,573 | 19 September |

=== Preliminary final ===
| Home team | Score | Away team | Score | Venue | Crowd | Date |
|---|---|---|---|---|---|---|
| South Melbourne | 13.11 (89) | Melbourne | 8.15 (63) | MCG | 50,738 | 26 September |

== Season notes ==
- Prior to the season, the Richmond Football Club formally announced its intentions to move its home base from the Punt Road Oval to the nearby Olympic Park, owing mostly to an ongoing dispute with the Richmond Cricket Club. Such a move required the approval of the League's Board of Management; the vote was tied 6–6, then voted down by the casting vote of League president William McClelland (a casting vote for the status quo was customary in the event of a tie). As such, Richmond was forced to remain at the Punt Road Oval.
- In Round 1, the first goal kicked by South Melbourne's Bob Pratt against Melbourne was his 500th career goal.
- In Round 7, Collingwood full-forward Gordon Coventry scored his 1,200th VFL goal.
- All Round 10 matches were postponed because all VFL grounds were under water following an extended period of torrential rain. All subsequent rounds were also pushed back by one week.
- After Round 13, Gordon Coventry was suspended for eight weeks for striking Richmond's Joe Murdoch, and missed the finals series.
- After Round 14, Essendon's forward-pocket Ted Bryce was suspended for eighteen weeks for kicking Carlton rover Norm Cashin.
- In Round 17, field-umpire Jack McMurray umpired his 300th senior VFL match.
- In Round 18, needing seven goals to reach 100, St Kilda's full-forward Bill Mohr kicked eight goals, finishing his season with 101 goals. In a 13-season (1929–1941), 735 goal career, this was his highest ever total.
- North Melbourne and Hawthorn both recorded their first wins against Richmond since entering the VFL in 1925. North Melbourne's win in Round 14 ended an 18-game losing streak against Richmond, and Hawthorn's win in Round 16 ended a 21-game losing streak.

== Awards ==
- The 1936 VFL Premiership team was Collingwood.
- The VFL's leading goalkicker was Bill Mohr of St Kilda with 101 goals.
- The Argus newspaper's "Player of the Year" was Bill Mohr of St Kilda.
- The winner of the 1936 Brownlow Medal was Denis Ryan of Fitzroy with 26 votes.
- Fitzroy took the "wooden spoon" in 1936.
- The seconds premiership was won by Footscray. Footscray 15.11 (101) defeated Melbourne 6.14 (50) in the Grand Final, played as a curtain-raiser to the firsts Grand Final on 3 October at the Melbourne Cricket Ground.

== Sources ==
- 1936 VFL season at AFL Tables
- 1936 VFL season at Australian Football
