= Robert Cashin =

Robert Cashin may refer to:

- Robert Cashin (senior) (fl. 1692), Archdeacon of Limerick
- Robert Cashin (junior) (before 1745 – after 1782), Archdeacon of Ardfert
