= Carolyn Mignini =

American actress

Carolyn Mignini is a Drama Desk Award nominated actress who has appeared on Broadway, television, and film. Critic Rex Reed called her "a radiantly talented singer" who "electrified Broadway."

== Early life ==
Mignini was born in Baltimore, one of six children. Her mother, Virginia, was a hairdresser, and her father Paul, the recipient of a Purple Heart and later, legislative representative of the Amalgamated Clothing and Textile Workers Union.

At 13, Mignini attended The Peabody Institute of Johns Hopkins University where she studied voice. At 17, she was crowned Miss Teenage America. During her tenure, she co-hosted the CBS World's Fair Special and Macy's Thanksgiving Day Parade, appeared on The Mike Douglas Show and To Tell the Truth, and represented Dr. Pepper with Dick Clark.

She later attended Boston Conservatory of Music and New York University.

== Stage ==
Mignini made her debut in the original Broadway run of Fiddler on the Roof with Adrienne Barbeau and Bette Midler, and later appeared in the show's 50th anniversary tribute at New York's Town Hall.

Mignini starred on Broadway and in Los Angeles in Tintypes, in which she played Anna Held and was nominated for a Drama Desk Award. Time magazine praised Mignini's "seraphic soprano" and her performance was memorialized by caricaturist Al Hirschfeld. The cast of Tintypes performed on The Tony Awards, The Kennedy Center Honors, recorded an original cast album, and the show was filmed for television.

Mignini played Assunta in the 2019 Marisa Tomei-led revival of Tennessee Williams' The Rose Tattoo on Broadway. She also appeared on Broadway in Tricks and Christopher Durang's A History of the American Film.

Off-Broadway, she appeared in A.R. Gurney's Middle Ages, Christopher Durang's Sister Mary Ignatius Explains It All For You, and in the Dorothy Fields' revue, A Lady Needs a Change. Additional Off-Broadway credits include The Fantasticks, I Married Wyatt Earp, Hereafter, Master Class as Maria Callas, Hard Sell, Mirandolina, Legs, and multiple productions at Ensemble Studio Theatre.

Regionally, Mignini appeared in the pre-Broadway tryout of One Night Stand with Tony Curtis, Because of Winn-Dixie, Dirt, A String of Pearls, and Death of a Salesman, and served as music director of a revival of Kurt Weill's Happy End in Los Angeles.

== Film and television ==
Mignini appeared in the films Worth with Michael Keaton, Bruce, If I Ever See You Again, and Backfield in Motion.

She played "Kathy" and "a million other characters" on Captain Kangaroo. In his memoir, Kangaroo star Bob Keeshan remarked that Mignini could "sing, dance, act, be funny and anything else you ask of her."

She had recurring roles as Maggie Gyllenhaal's mother on The Deuce and in the Ben Stiller-helmed Escape at Dannemora.

She appeared in episodes of House of Cards, Blue Bloods, The Good Wife, Veep, Alien Nation, Mad About You, The Wonder Years, Murphy Brown, Picket Fences, Family Ties, 21 Jump Street, Fame, Newhart, and others.

She was a member of the musical group "The Klowns," whose album was released by RCA Victor. The group appeared on an ABC primetime television special with Sammy Davis Jr., Jerry Lewis, Juliet Prowse, and Ringling Brothers & Barnum & Bailey Circus.

== Personal life ==
She is married to actor Steve Vinovich. They have two children.
