= John Enraght =

John Enraght (1701-1766) was an eighteenth century Irish Anglican priest: the Archdeacon of Ardfert from 1765 until 1766.

Enraght was born in County Kerry and educated at Trinity College, Dublin. He died on 18 October 1766; and is buried in Corston, Somerset.

Church of Ireland titles
Preceded by William Cameron	Archdeacon of Ardfert; 1765–1766	Succeeded by Robert Cashin
