= Robert Cashin (junior) =

Irish Anglican priest

Robert Cashin was an Irish Anglican priest.

The son of Robert Cashin, Archdeacon of Limerick, he graduated from Trinity College, Dublin in 1745. He was Prebendary of St Munchin's in Limerick Cathedral, Vicar general of the Diocese of Limerick, Ardfert and Aghadoe then Archdeacon of Ardfert from 1767 to 1782.

Church of Ireland titles
Preceded by John Enraght	Archdeacon of Ardfert; 1767–1772	Succeeded by Charles Massy
