= Mr. Moose =

Puppet character

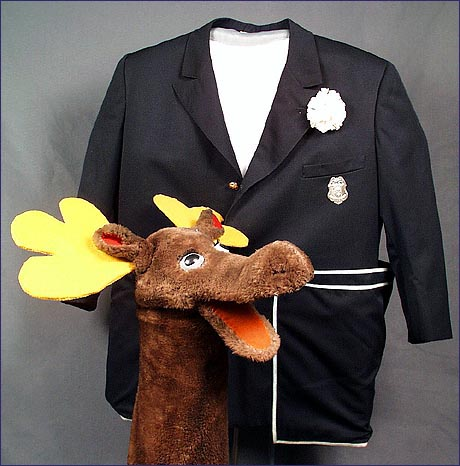
Mr. Moose and the Captain's Jacket at the Smithsonian Institution

Mr. Moose was a puppet character on the children's television show Captain Kangaroo. Mr. Moose was created and played by Cosmo Allegretti, who also created and played Mr. Bunny Rabbit, Dancing Bear, and the Captain's painter and handyman Dennis.

While the character did engage in serious conversation, Mr. Moose's ultimate goal was always to maneuver Captain Kangaroo into participating in a riddle or knock-knock joke, the punchline of which would inevitably be followed by hundreds of ping pong balls raining harmlessly but annoyingly down on the Captain. This frequent set-up was a major source of hilarity for the pre-kindergarten audience. The viewers knew the ping pong balls were coming, but the Captain would walk right into the trap every time.

== Remote shoots ==
The show would often have brief segments filmed at remote locations. On at least two occasions, an entire episode was handled as a remote shoot, with Mr. Moose stealing the show.

One was set at the Oshkosh Air Show, where fellow puppet Bunny Rabbit climbed into a yellow aircraft without permission. Captain Kangaroo climbed in to retrieve him, only to have Bunny Rabbit crank the engine and begin a takeoff roll. Following scenes showed the Captain panicking as the craft became airborne with Bunny Rabbit at the controls. Seconds later, there came the ominous sound of a second engine. The camera changed point of view to a green hilltop, over which sprang a red tri-plane, flown not by Baron Richthofen but instead by Mr. Moose. An inverted dogfight ensued to the music of "Those Magnificent Men in their Flying Machines."

The other remote shoot was premised on Captain Kangaroo awaking to his surprise in the Colonial era. In short order, he met Squire Greenjeans and the mysterious Monsieur Moose who dropped hay on people because ping pong balls hadn't been invented yet.

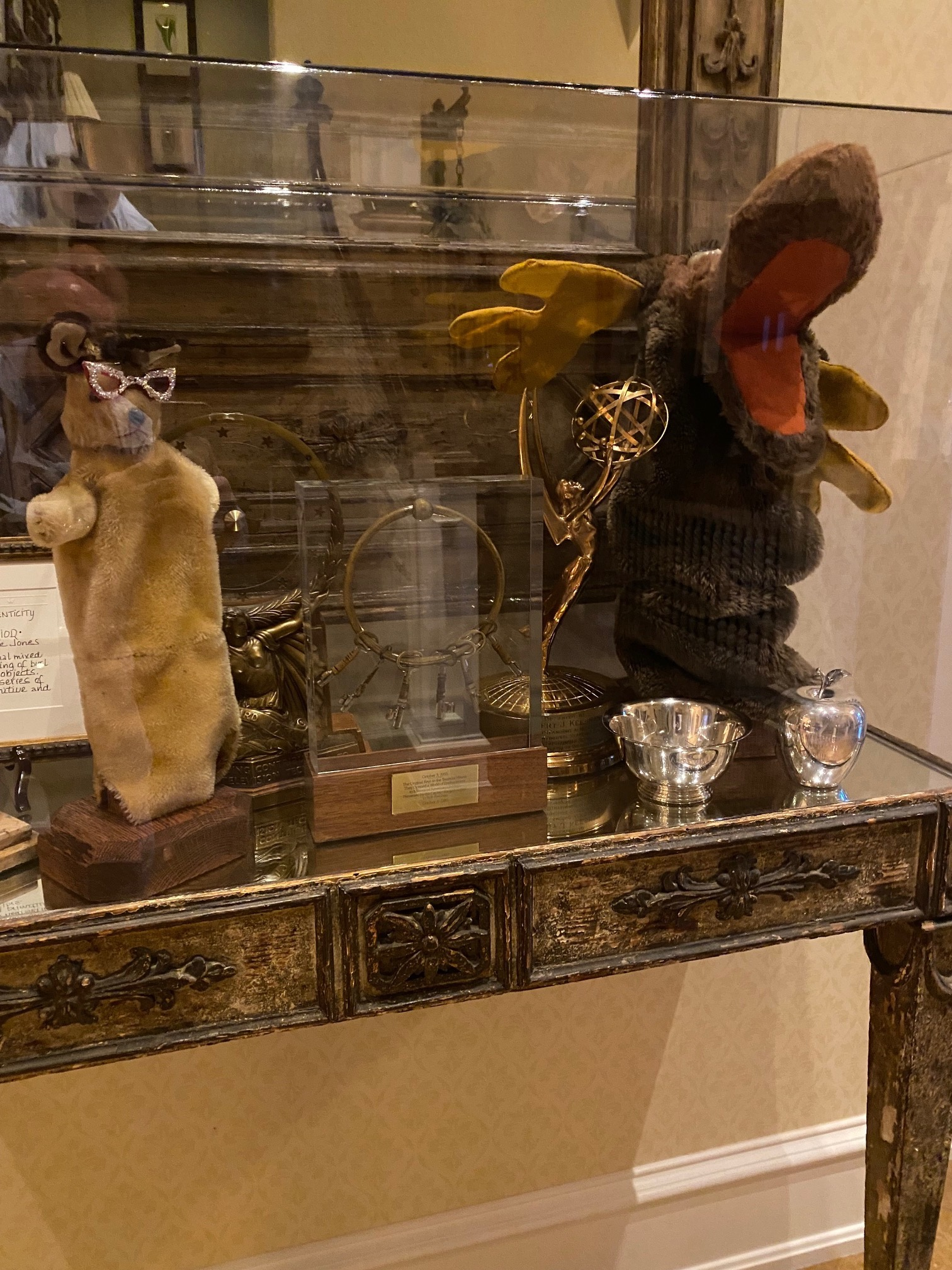
Allan Jones, a collector from Cleveland, Tennessee, owns the Mr. Moose puppet and is credited with having the most extensive collection of Captain Kangaroo memorabilia in the world.

== In other media ==
In the animated television series Family Guy episode "Hell Comes to Quahog", after Joe sends a ping pong ball out a window, Peter persuades Mr. Moose to say "Knock, knock", then answers "Ping pong balls!", and ping pong balls fall on top of Peter.
