= James Williams (archdeacon of Ardfert) =

Francis Lauder (d 13 February 1724) was an eighteenth century Irish Anglican priest: in 1721 he became Precentor of Ardfert; and later that year Archdeacon of Ardfert from 1724 until 1738.
