= William Cameron (priest) =

Irish Anglican priest

William Cameron (1688–1765) was an Eighteenth Century Irish Anglican priest: the Archdeacon of Ardfert from 1738 until 1765.

Enraght was born in Galway and educated at Trinity College, Dublin. Cameron was ordained on 2 March 1717. In 1728 he became Precentor of Ardfert.

Church of Ireland titles
Preceded by Francis Lauder	Archdeacon of Ardfert; 1738–1765	Succeeded by John Enraght
