= Captain Kangaroo =

American children's television series

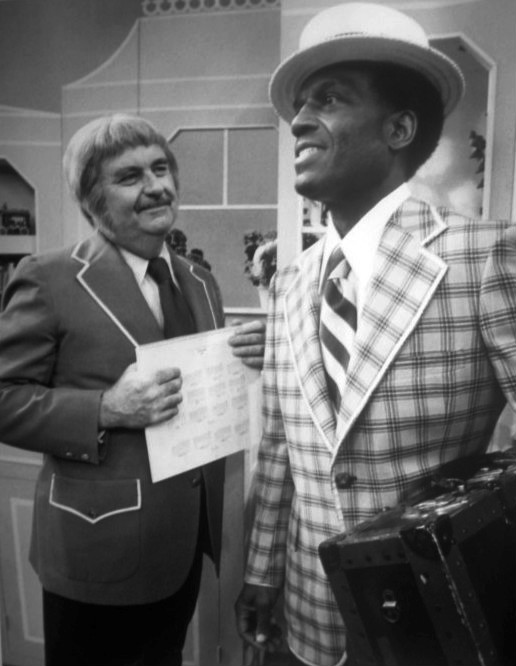
- Captain Kangaroo (Bob Keeshan), left, with Nipsey Russell in 1976
- Created by: Bob Keeshan
- Written by: Howard Friedlander
- Starring: Bob Keeshan; Hugh Brannum
- Opening theme: "Puffin' Billy" (The Captain Kangaroo Theme) (1955–1974); "Good Morning, Captain" (1974–1984)
- Country of origin: United States
- No. of seasons: 29
- No. of episodes: 6,090

Production
- Production location: CBS Broadcast Center
- Running time: 60 minutes / 30 minutes
- Production companies: Robert Keeshan Associates; Marvin Josephson Associates

Original release
- Network: CBS
- Release: October 3, 1955 – December 8, 1984

Captain Kangaroo is an American children's television series that aired weekday mornings on the American television network CBS for 29 years, from 1955 to 1984, making it the longest-running children's program on a commercial network. In 1986, the American Program Service (now American Public Television) integrated some newly produced segments into reruns of past episodes, distributing the newer version of the series to PBS and independent public stations until 1993.

== Conception ==
The show was conceived by Bob Keeshan, who also played the title character "Captain Kangaroo", and who based the show on "the warm relationship between grandparents and children". Keeshan had portrayed the original Clarabell the Clown on NBC's The Howdy Doody Show during the network's early years.

== Show structure ==
Captain Kangaroo had a loose structure, built around life in the "Treasure House" where the Captain (the name "kangaroo" came from the bigger pockets in his coat) would perform storytelling, meet guests, and indulge in silly stunts with regular characters, both humans and puppets. Keeshan performed as the Captain more than 9,000 times over the nearly 30-year run of the show.

== Changes in setting and duration ==
The May 17, 1971, episode had two major changes on the show: The Treasure House was renovated and renamed "The Captain's Place" and the Captain replaced his navy blue coat with a red coat. In September 1981, CBS shortened the hour-long show to a half-hour, briefly retitled it Wake Up with the Captain, and moved it to an earlier time slot; it was moved to weekends in September 1982, and returned to an hour-long format. CBS canceled Captain Kangaroo at the end of 1984.

== Longevity record ==
Captain Kangaroo was the longest-running American network children's television show until 1997 when it was surpassed by Mister Rogers' Neighborhood, which itself was surpassed by Sesame Street in 2003. Captain Kangaroo is still far and away the longest-running children's TV series by episode count with 6,090 episodes. When one counts the 65 edited versions (severely altered re-runs) that aired on PBS the episode count goes up to 6,155. As of October 2024, second-place holder Sesame Street has aired 4,731 episodes.

== Cast ==
- Bob Keeshan as Captain Kangaroo, Mr. Pennywhistle, Mr. Doodle, Wally, and the Town Clown
- Hugh "Lumpy" Brannum as Mr. Green Jeans, the New Old Folk Singer, Percy, Uncle Backwards, Mr. McGregor, and Mr. Bainter the Painter
- Cosmo Allegretti appeared as Mr. Bunny Rabbit and Mr. Moose (both of which he also created), Dennis the Apprentice, Willy, Miss Frog, Mr. Whispers, Dancing Bear, Grandfather Clock, and Uncle Ralph; he was the voice of Aniforms puppet TV Fred (a live-action on-screen puppet that appeared behind the blackboard in the Treasure House), and was the artist behind the Magic Drawing Board

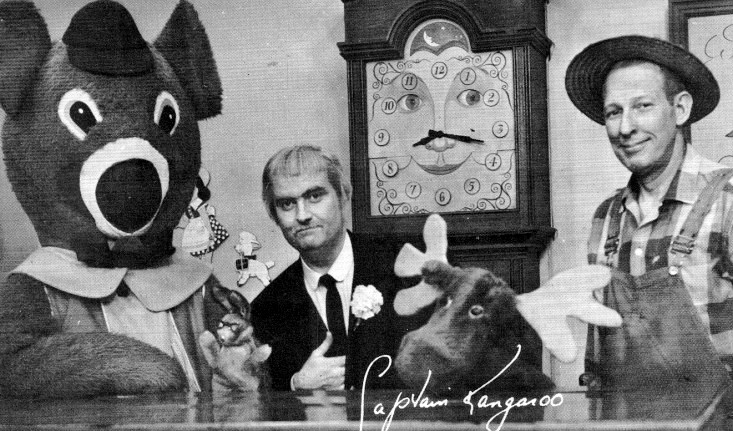
From left: Dancing Bear, Bunny Rabbit, Captain Kangaroo, Grandfather Clock, Mr. Moose, and Mr. Green Jeans

- Sam Levine as the Banana Man; the character was created for vaudeville by Adolph Proper
- Bill Cosby as himself, the host of the Picture Pages segment (1980–1984)
- Debbie Weems appeared as Debbie (1973–1978); the voice for the puppet character Baby Duck
- James Wall as Mr. Baxter (1968–1978); was also the stage manager
- Carolyn Mignini as Kathy and other female roles (1981–1983)
- Kevin Clash as the puppet character Artie (1980–1984) and as himself, acting in many of the sketches
- John Burstein as Slim Goodbody (1978–1981)
- Bill McCutcheon as Mr. Homan (1965–1968)
- Jane Connell as Mrs. Homan (1965–1968)
- Dr. Joyce Brothers as herself for three seasons

== Format ==
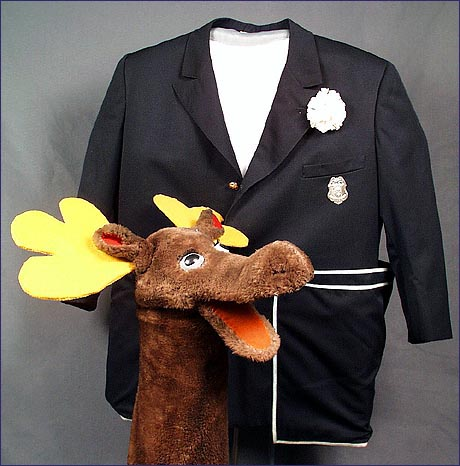
Mr. Moose and the Captain's original navy blue jacket at the Smithsonian Institution

The show takes place in and around the Treasure House, later called the Captain's Place, where the Captain would interact with puppets, guests, and other members of the cast. Even the opening sequence changed.

Each episode began with the theme music playing, then the Captain makes his entrance to the studio by unlocking and opening the doors of the Treasure House from the inside, where viewers would catch their first glimpse of him. Then he puts the Treasure House keys on a nail, and the music ends. On rare occasions, the Captain could not get the keys to stay on the nail, and when they fell off, the theme song plays again. One never knew exactly what would happen from one episode to the next, although at certain times of the year, such as the Christmas season, paper cutout versions of such stories as The Littlest Snowman would be shown.

=== Cartoons ===
Several cartoon shorts were featured over the course of the series' run, including:

A cartoon starring a funnel-capped shapeshifting boy named Tom Terrific was part of the show in the 1950s and 1960s. Tom had a sidekick named Mighty Manfred the Wonder Dog, and an archenemy, Crabby Appleton ("I'm rotten to the core!"). Other cartoons included Lariat Sam, who (aided by his loyal horse Tippytoes), confronted his nemesis Badlands Meanie and his sidekick Bushwhack. The Adventures of Lariat Sam was developed by veteran game show announcer Gene Wood, then a show staffer (who also sang the cartoon's theme song).

The British cartoon Simon in the Land of Chalk Drawings appeared in the 1970s, featuring a child with magic chalk who could create all sorts of short-lived creations in short adventures. The original version featured a British narrator, Bernard Cribbins, but Keeshan's voice was dubbed onto the cartoons for their U.S. airing.

Another British-produced cartoon, Ludwig, about a magical egg-shaped robot, was also included around the same time as Simon. The cartoon's musical score consisted of selections from the works of Beethoven.

Also appearing in the 1970s was The Most Important Person, a series of five-minute segments on the importance of life, and The Kingdom of Could Be You, a series of five-minute segments on the importance of careers and the work world.

The cartoon series called The Toothbrush Family was based on an extended family of hygiene utensils, as the name suggests; they would embark on adventures based in the bathroom, like water skiing in the tub, or rescuing friends caught in the drain. Episodes were generally a few minutes each and basically revolved around teaching children the importance of oral hygiene.

A silent cartoon in the 1970s named Crystal Tipps and Alistair featured the adventures of a young girl and her dog. Later reruns were narrated by the voice of Mr. Moose. Another British favorite, The Wombles, was also featured.

The Red and the Blue shorts from Italy, as well as The Undersea Adventures of Captain Nemo, featuring a family of sea explorers, were also shown.

=== "Good morning, Captain!" ===
Starting in 1974, the show opened with different people wishing the Captain "good morning". Many of the openings featured noncelebrities, but some featured stars from TV shows, most of which broadcast over CBS. The montage of "good mornings" always ended with the Captain himself returning the greeting before the opening sequence.

=== Regular features ===
Other regular features included The Magic Drawing Board and the Captain's "Reading Stories" sessions, which introduced kids to stories such as Curious George, Make Way for Ducklings, Stone Soup, Caps for Sale, and Mike Mulligan and His Steam Shovel. The Sweet Pickles books were also featured.

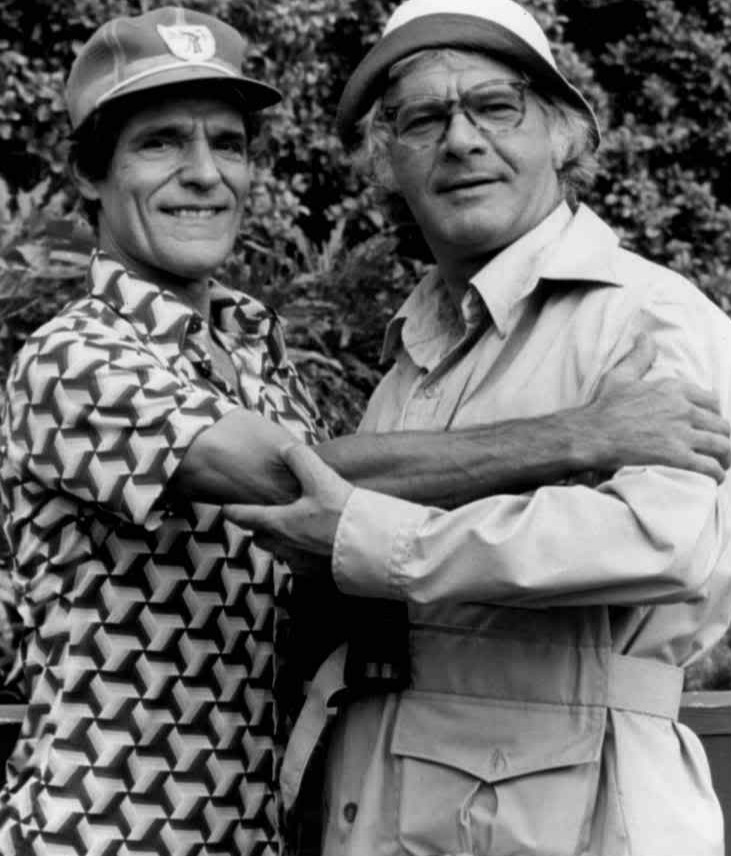
Puppeteer Cosmo Allegretti (left) with actor Dick Shawn, 1977: Allegretti played many roles on the program.

Songs were a regular part of the show, from "Captain Kangaroo" to many traditional tunes to popular songs interpreted by puppets. Carmino Ravosa was a songwriter on the show from 1975 to 1977.

On the first show of every month, the Captain had a birthday cake for all of the children with birthdays that month.

Keeshan also had a recurring role as the Town Clown, a pantomime piece that took place in and around the exposed wagon home of a tramp-like circus clown. Like the character Clarabelle that he played on Howdy Doody, the Town Clown never spoke.

Favorite characters on the show were Grandfather Clock (voiced by Cosmo Allegretti), Bunny Rabbit, Rollo the Hippo, and Dancing Bear. Dancing Bear was mute and only appeared in short subject features. He often danced waltzes to background music.

One of the show's long-running gags was the "Ping-Pong Ball Drop", instigated by the telling of a joke (usually a knock-knock joke) by Mr. Moose, in which the punchline included the words "ping-pong balls". At the mention of those three words, a shower of ping-pong balls was released from above on the Captain.

The show often had simple black light theatre segments using paper or cardboard cutouts. A notable recording of a popular song, such as Judy Garland's Decca recording of "Over the Rainbow" (from The Wizard of Oz), Mary Martin singing "Never Never Land" (from the original cast recording of the musical Peter Pan), or Danny Kaye singing "Inchworm" (from the Decca recording of the songs from Hans Christian Andersen) were heard while the cutouts played on the screen, animated by a concealed puppeteer. On other occasions, full-fledged hand puppets "performed" to the song being played (as in the case when a hand puppet dressed in Spanish clothing performed to a recording of tenor Allan Jones singing "The Donkey Serenade").

Also, about two or three times in an episode, short film clips on certain topics played over a song about that particular topic.

Especially in later seasons, the show also featured a running gag in selected episodes during which the Captain would try to perform a particular activity three or four times, only to fail in a different way with each attempt.

Familiar props included a mockup of a talking cathedral-style radio that Keeshan simply called Radio. Keeshan would turn the large knobs on Radio to get a conversation going. Reminiscent of the old Atwater Kent cathedrals, Radio had a rather interesting conversation with a smaller transistor radio in one show. Also featured was a huge Colgate toothpaste box with a large windup or clockwork key on the side. Keeshan turned the key to play a jingle ("Colgate Fluoride M-F-P/Helps Prevent the Cavity/And it Tastes Great, Naturally!") for the show's sponsor, Colgate Toothpaste.

At the end of each episode, the Captain always encouraged parents watching the show to spend some quality time with their children every day, and he often demonstrated various creative ways in which to do so. In later seasons, that changed to him saying, "Well, what would you like to do today? You know it could be a good day for..." then a song would list many different activities while short film clips of each corresponding activity are presented, then the song ended with the singers saying, "There's so much to do. These things are just a few." Then it would cut back to the Captain, who would sign off with, "So whatever you do, have a great day!"

== Theme song ==
The first theme song for Captain Kangaroo titled "Puffin' Billy" was used from the show's debut in 1955 until 1974. It was an instrumental piece of light music, written by Edward G. White and recorded by the Melodi Light Orchestra. The track was from a British stock music production library known as the Chappell Recorded Music Library, which was sold through a New York agency called Emil Ascher. The tune's original title referred to a British steam locomotive. The tune was used on various programs on both sides of the Atlantic and was already popular in the United Kingdom: for example, two years before Captain Kangaroo, it served as the wrap-up music for an episode of the radio program Rocky Fortune called "Murder Among the Statues". In the United Kingdom, it became famous as the theme to the weekly BBC radio program Children's Favourites from 1952 to 1966, and is still widely recognised by the postwar generation. It was later used in the Enid Blyton parody Five Go Mad in Dorset and in a number of British TV advertisements, including a Captain Sensible spot. The "Puffin' Billy" theme played as the opening of each episode, with the music continuing until the Captain hung his large ring of keys on a nail, which seemed to act as a switch to end the music abruptly. If the Captain's keys ever slipped off the nail, the music plays again. In 1957, lyricist Mary Rogers penned lyrics to the tune, creating a newly titled Captain Kangaroo song.

In 1974, a new theme song titled "Good Morning, Captain" was composed for Captain Kangaroo, written by Robert L. Brush. As the new theme used similar melodic elements from the original theme, Edward G. White's name was added to the song credits. However, due to copyright issues, the song was re-recorded in 1979 without the portion of "Puffin' Billy" featured in the first version. During the brief Wake Up With the Captain era, a theme titled "Wake Up" was used, but was dropped after the program moved to weekends. For the show's later seasons from 1982 to 1984 and subsequent PBS run, Schoolhouse Rock mainstay Lynn Ahrens (who composed and performed a few Captain Kangaroo songs herself) wrote a new theme, entitled "Here Comes Captain Kangaroo".

The theme song for The All New Captain Kangaroo used the opening notes and part of the melody of the original theme as its introduction. Bob Keeshan also recorded music for both Columbia Records and Golden Records, aimed at introducing all kinds of music to children.

== Schedule history ==
While Captain Kangaroo was still in planning stages, CBS executives had the idea of hiring Al Lewis, who was hosting a popular kids' show at WCPO-TV in Cincinnati, to host their program. But when station management refused to release Lewis from his contract, they selected Keeshan to host. Lewis' own program, The Uncle Al Show, ended its run in Cincinnati a year after Captain Kangaroo left CBS.

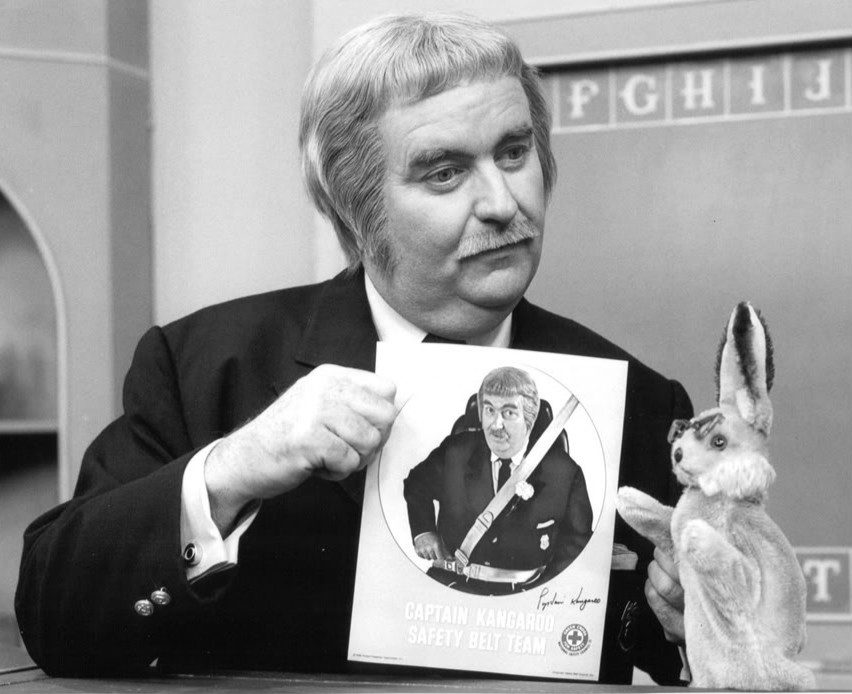
Keeshan and Bunny Rabbit promote an auto seat belt campaign, 1970

CBS aired the program on weekday mornings, initially telecast live in the Eastern and Central time zones at 8:00 am (ET)/7:00 am (CT) for its first four years (it would eventually be scheduled for 8:00 am in all time zones). Same-day episodes would be broadcast on kinescope for Western audiences, as Keeshan would not perform the show live three times a day. For the first three months, Captain Kangaroo was only seen on weekday mornings. From December 1955 until 1968, the show was also seen on Saturday mornings, except in the 1964–1965 season, when it was replaced by a Keeshan vehicle called Mr. Mayor. Except for pre-emption by news or special events, notably the four-day continuous coverage which followed the November 22, 1963, assassination of John F. Kennedy, and a few shows that were 45 minutes, the show aired a full 60 minutes on weekday mornings until 1981.

The audience of children could never compete in the ratings with such entertainment/news shows as NBC's Today, although Captain Kangaroo won Emmy Awards three times as Outstanding Children's entertainment series in 1978–1979, 1982–1983, and 1983–1984. In the fall of 1981, to make more room for the expansion of The CBS Morning News, the Captain was moved to an earlier time slot of 7:00 am and cut to 30 minutes, sporting the new title Wake Up with the Captain. The show was moved again in the spring of 1982 to 6:30 am, a time when few children (or adults) were awake. In the fall of 1982, it returned to an hour format, but was moved to Saturday mornings at 7:00 am ET and 6:00 am in other time zones. Reruns from the previous season were offered to CBS affiliates to run Sunday morning in place of the cartoon reruns offered before, but most declined. One-third of affiliates no longer ran the show at all after 1982, and it was again reduced to a half-hour in the fall of 1984. Angered over the reduction of his program for the second time, Keeshan chose to step down at the end of 1984, after his contract with CBS expired. After the show ended, Children's Television Workshop hired some of its staff to work on Sesame Street.

Just over a year later, on September 1, 1986, Captain Kangaroo returned in reruns on PBS, with funding from public television stations, School Zone Publishing Company, and the John D. and Catherine T. MacArthur Foundation. American Public Television, then known as the Interregional Program Service, distributed the show, along with Britder Associates (Keeshan's production company).

The original director of the program was Peter Birch, who helmed the program for its first 25 years. Producer Jimmy Hirschfeld took over as director following Birch's heart attack in 1980 and continued directing, as well as producing throughout the rest of the show's run, including the new segments inserted into the PBS reruns, until it went off the air in 1993.

The cast of Captain Kangaroo also hosted the CBS coverage of the Macy's Thanksgiving Day Parade for several years in the 1960s.

== Schwinn marketing ==
From the late 1950s, the Schwinn Bicycle Company made use of children's television programming to expand its dominance of the child and youth bicycle markets. The company was an early sponsor (from 1958) of Captain Kangaroo. The Captain himself was enlisted to sell Schwinn-brand bicycles to the show's audience, typically six years old and under. At the end of each live Schwinn marketing promotion, Bob Keeshan would intone, "Schwinn bikes—the quality bikes—are best!" and "Prices slightly higher in the South and in the West". The on-air marketing program was deemed successful by Schwinn, and the company increased its market share of child and youth bicycles throughout the 1960s.

The marketing program continued through the 1971 season, when the Federal Trade Commission's Staff Report, Guidelines on Advertising to Children, recommended against Schwinn's on-air marketing practices using the show's host. In response, Schwinn and the show's writers altered the format in 1972. The Captain no longer insisted that his viewers purchase a Schwinn, but instead made regular on-air consultations of a new character, Mr. Schwinn Dealer. A 1973 internal company news article concluded that the show's child audience had difficulty separating Schwinn's sales pitch from the regular content of the show.

== 1997 reboot ==
In 1997–2000, a rebooted series titled The All New Captain Kangaroo was produced by Saban Entertainment in association with TLC Entertainment. Eric S. Rollman, who also served as President of Saban and Fox Family Productions, was executive producer. George Taweel and Rob Loos of TLC produced the series. John McDonough played the Captain on this version, which was shot in Tampa, Florida, and featured animal segments shot at Busch Gardens Tampa Bay and Seaworld in Orlando. Keeshan was invited to appear as a special guest called "The Admiral", but declined. Thirteen episodes were produced for syndication with an additional twenty-seven episodes serving as the centerpiece for a programming block on Fox, Fox Kids Network (later known as Fox Kids), and The Family Channel (later known as Fox Family Channel) dubbed Captain Kangaroo's Treasure House, from 1997 to 2000; the block also featured reruns of Thomas the Tank Engine and Friends and Magic Adventures of Mumfie, as well a spin-off show, Mister Moose's Fun Time, which included cartoon segments from around the world, as well as clips from The Wiggles. When Disney bought Fox Family, the company shelved The All New Captain Kangaroo and Mister Moose's Fun Time, allegedly due to the fact the reboot advertised Busch Gardens and SeaWorld, rivals of Walt Disney World.

== Trademark ==
In 2011, the trademark for the Captain Kangaroo name was acquired by the Cashin Comedy Co. In a blog, the Captain is portrayed by Pat Cashin, an entertainer and professional clown. Cashin died in 2016 at the age of 48, leaving the rights to this version with his estate. Creative Artists Agency, the successor to Captain Kangaroo's previous rights holders Marvin Josephson Associates and ICM Partners, is the current owner of the series.

== See also ==
- Pee-wee's Playhouse
