= The Banana Man =

Vaudeville character by Adolf Proper

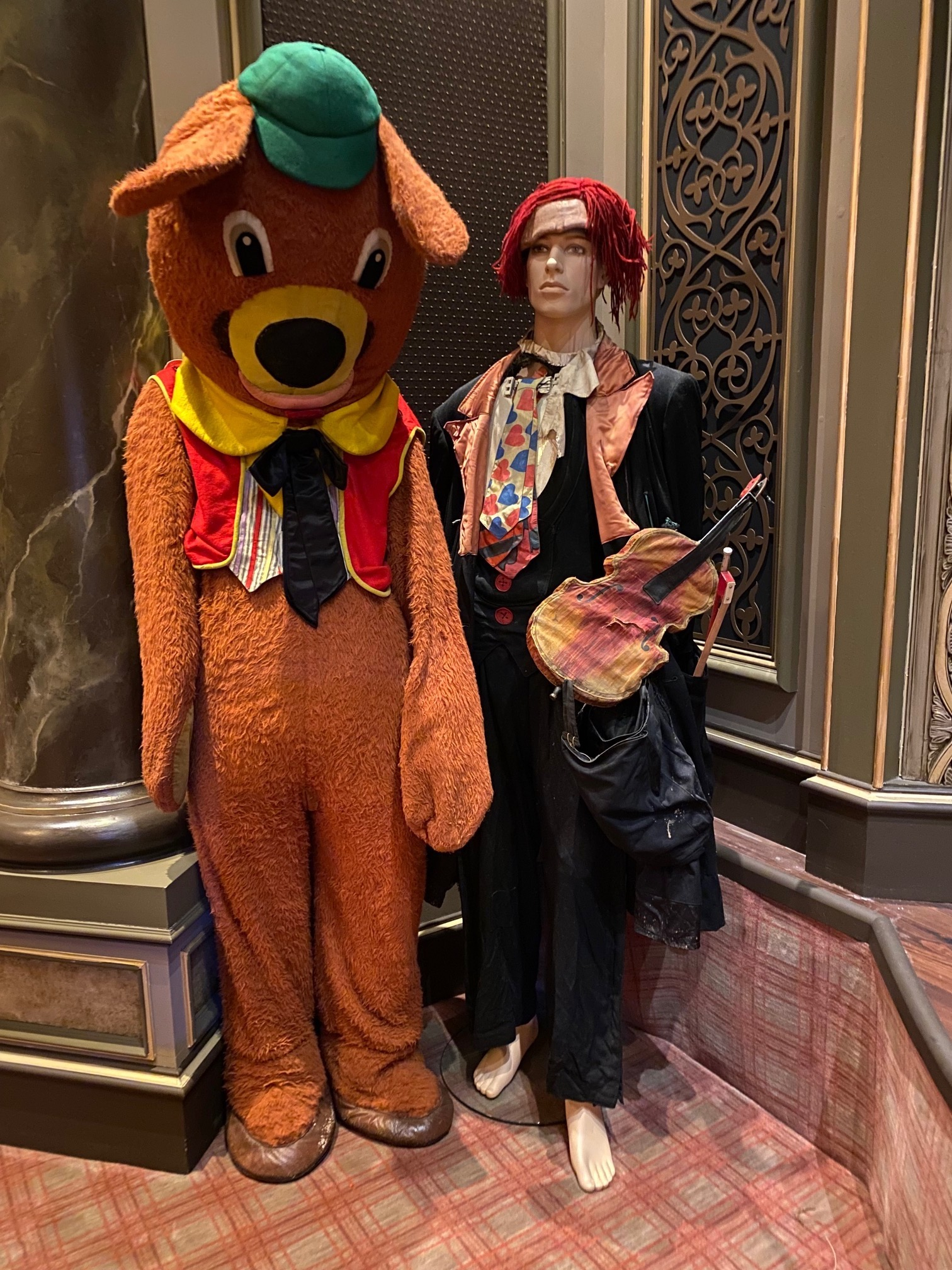
The Banana Man costume and props reside in a private collection in Cleveland, Tennessee. The costume is seen here with the original Dancing Bear costume.

The Banana Man was a vaudeville character created by Adolf Proper (November 27, 1886–December 18, 1950) who worked under the stage name "A. Robins". After Proper's death, the character was played on television by Sam Levine.

== Adolf Proper as A. Robins ==
Adolf Proper was born in Vienna, and emigrated to the United States in 1911. He first performed at the Palace Theatre in New York in 1918. He played with a backdrop of cardboard cut-outs of musicians, which he worked mechanically to give the impression that they were playing. His early act involved him taking cups and saucers from hiding places in his clothing, and pouring milk from his sleeves.

The Banana Man act consisted of Proper, dressed as a clownish character in a baggy tuxedo, producing an amazing and apparently impossible number of props from countless pockets and secret places in his costume. He would then perform various clown routines with the props. These props included (among many other things) a clarinet, a mandolin, a huge magnet, a violin, a music stand, several watermelons, and three hundred bananas. He did not speak in words, but uttered cries of delight, surprise, etc., in a nasal falsetto, and imitated the sounds of the musical instruments he "played." His costume was also capable of quick transformation, converting to a woman's dress and back again in seconds. A profile of Proper in The New Yorker reported that the costume weighed 60 pounds loaded, and it took him 45 minutes to prepare it for each performance.

Proper performed as The Banana Man in the Broadway musical Jumbo, in the short film Seeing Red starring Red Skelton, and in the 1947 feature film Mother Wore Tights starring Betty Grable. He died in hospital in Bournemouth, England, after becoming ill while on a voyage on the transatlantic liner Queen Elizabeth.

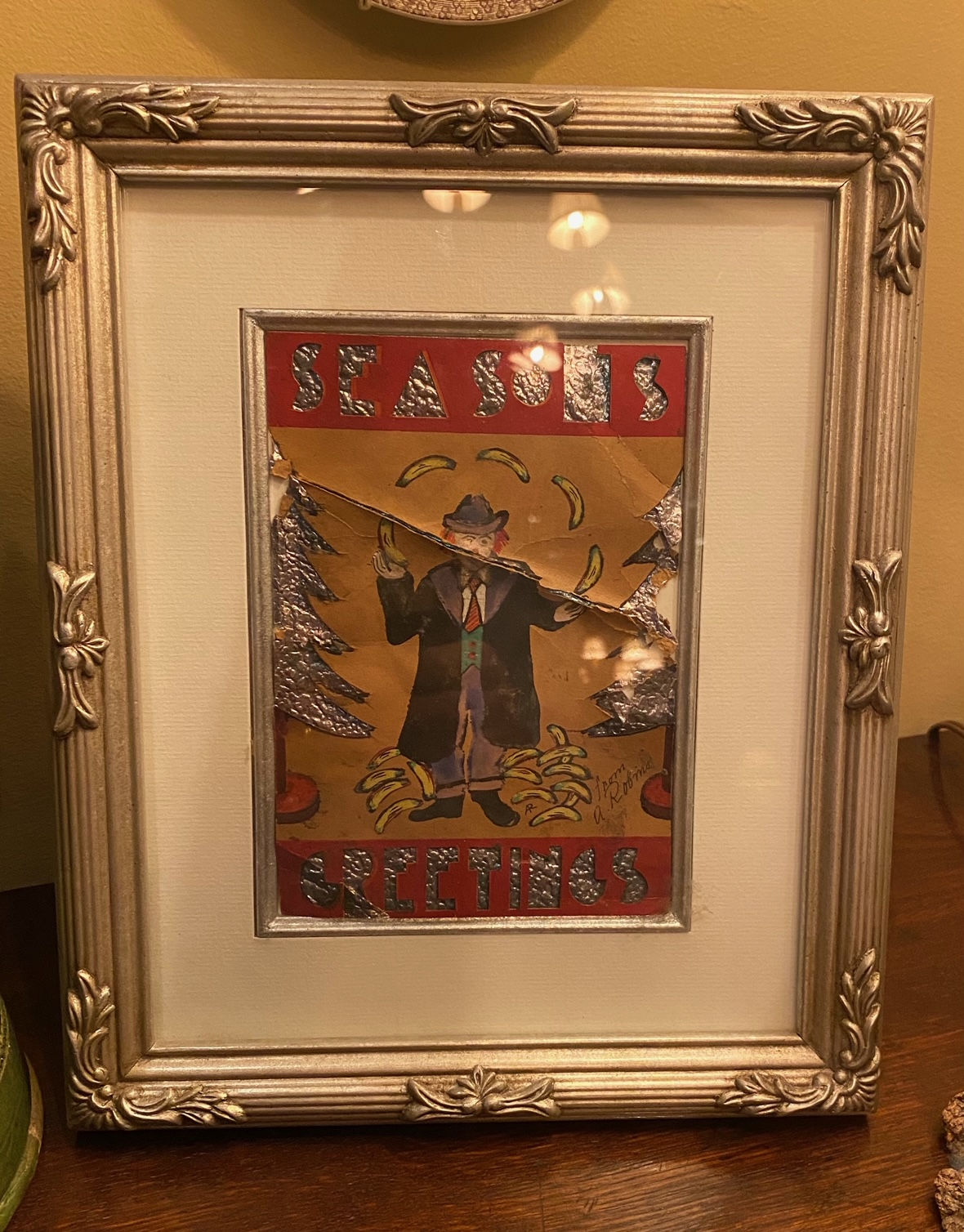
A Christmas card designed by A. Robins, who created the Banana Man character. The card resides in the collection of Captain Kangaroo collector Allan Jones in Cleveland, Tennessee.

== Later performers and properties ==
Sam Levine (1915–1997) bought Proper's original props and gimmicks from Proper's estate, and performed as The Banana Man on Captain Kangaroo and The Ed Sullivan Show. Allan Jones, a collector from Cleveland, Tennessee, purchased the entirety of the Banana Man props and gimmicks – as well as the rights to the act – on November 13, 2003, from collector Leonard Goodstein of Brooklyn, New York. Goodstein originally purchased the items from the widow of Levine's agent, Max Roth. The Jones family owns the most extensive collection of Captain Kangaroo memorabilia in the world, including the Dancing Bear costume, as well as the Mr. Moose and Bunny Rabbit puppets used on the show. Jones' collection also includes Captain Kangaroo's famous navy blue jacket and the Captain's blonde wig with sideburns. Both were worn on every episode of the program from 1955 until 1971. Jones also owns the Wizard costume, along with the famous keys to the Treasure House. The keys appeared in every episode of the show's first decade, from 1955 to 1965.
