= Francis Lauder =

Irish Anglican priest

Francis Lauder (1688–1765) was an eighteenth century Irish Anglican priest: the Archdeacon of Ardfert from 1724 until 1738.

Enraght was born in County Offaly and educated at Trinity College, Dublin. In 1721 he became Precentor of Ardfert.

Church of Ireland titles
Preceded by James Williams	Archdeacon of Ardfert; 1732–1738	Succeeded by William Cameron
