= Bob Keeshan =

American children's television personality and host (1927–2004)

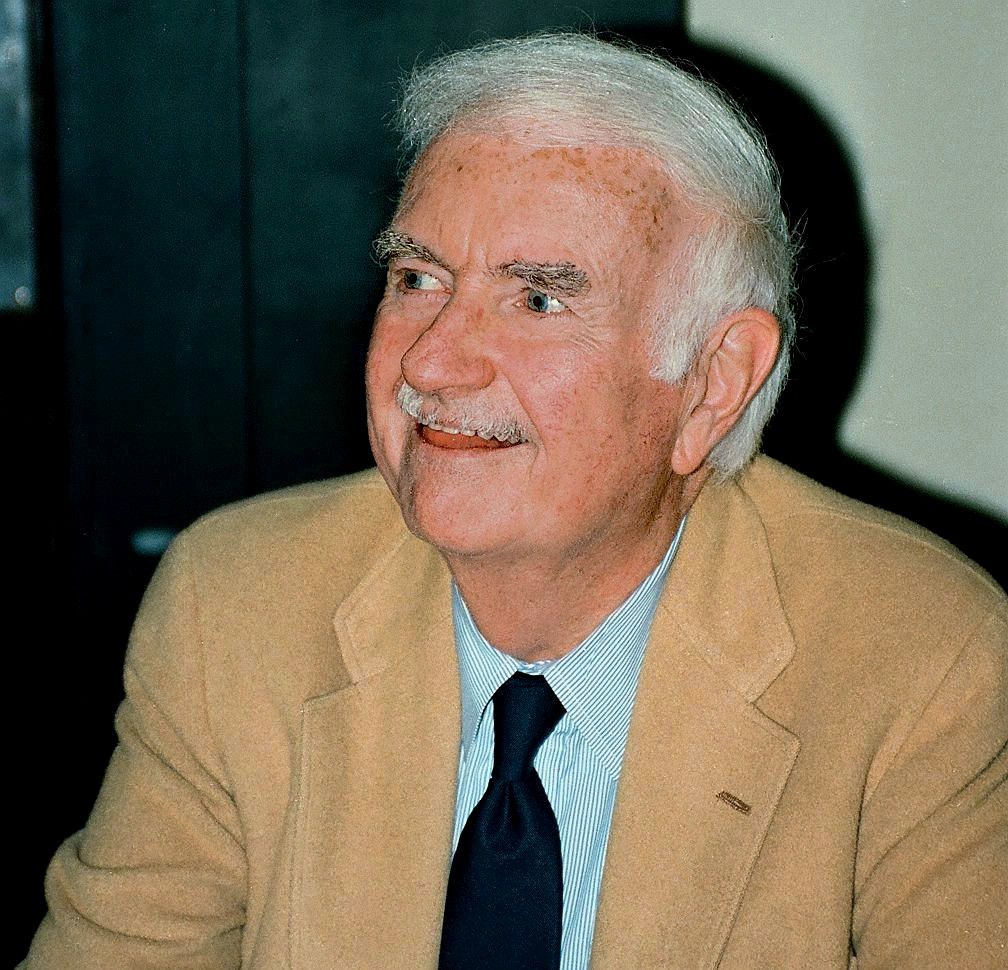
- Keeshan in 1995
- Born: Robert James Keeshan; June 27, 1927; Lynbrook, New York, U.S.
- Died: January 23, 2004 (aged 76); Windsor, Vermont, U.S.
- Resting place: Saint Joseph Roman Catholic Cemetery, Babylon, New York, U.S.
- Education: Fordham University
- Occupations: Television host, producer, actor
- Years active: 1947–2004
- Spouse: Anne Laurie (m. 1950; died 1996)
- Children: 3

Robert James Keeshan (June 27, 1927 – January 23, 2004) was an American television producer and actor. He created and played the title role in the children's television program Captain Kangaroo, which ran from 1955 to 1984, the longest-running nationally broadcast children's television program of its day. He also played the original Clarabell the Clown on the Howdy Doody television program.

== Early life ==
Robert James Keeshan was born to Irish parents in Lynbrook, New York. After an early graduation in 1945 from Forest Hills High School in Queens, New York, during World War II, he enlisted in the United States Marine Corps Reserve, but was still in the United States when Japan surrendered. He attended Fordham University on the GI Bill. He received his bachelor's degree in education in 1951.

An urban legend claims that actor Lee Marvin said on The Tonight Show that he had fought alongside Keeshan at the Battle of Iwo Jima in 1945. Over time, this legend has been published verbatim. Other legends had compounded on it, such that Keeshan was a trained killer, that he was awarded the Navy Cross, that he was a tough sergeant who saved the lives of dozens of men and women in the war, and that he destroyed a German tank in action in North Africa (an apparent confusion with a similarly named British soldier). However, Marvin never made the statement (he never served in Iwo Jima, but was wounded during the Battle of Saipan). Keeshan never saw combat in World War II, having enlisted too late to serve overseas. The Naval Historical Center in Washington, D.C, still receives calls inquiring about Keeshan's military record. Keeshan continuously dispelled the rumors.

== Television career ==
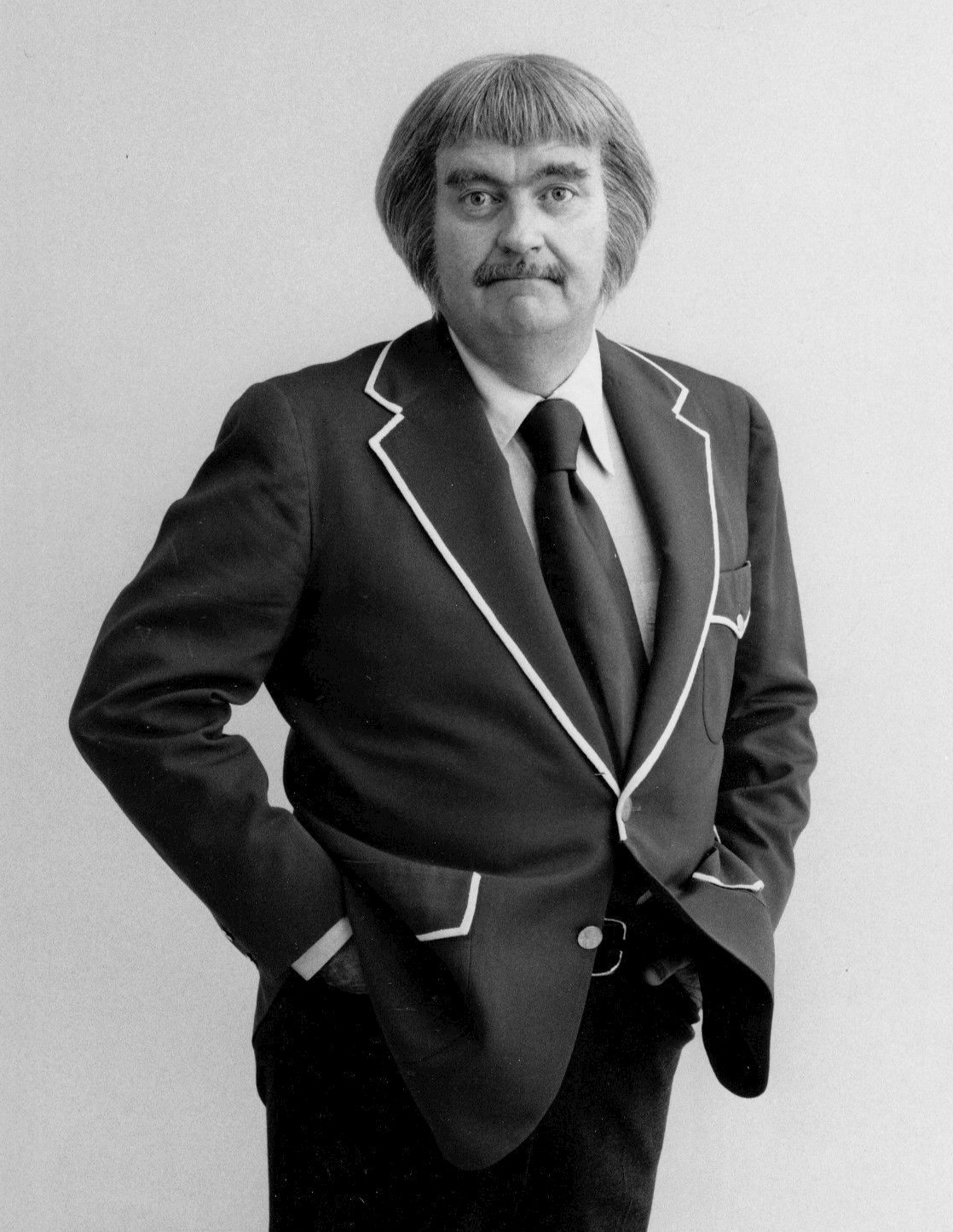
Keeshan as Captain Kangaroo

Network television programs began shortly after the end of the war. Howdy Doody, which premiered in 1947 on NBC, was one of the first. Starting on January 3, 1948, Keeshan played Clarabell the Clown, a silent Auguste clown who communicated by honking several horns attached to a belt around his waist. One honk meant "yes"; two meant "no". Clarabell often sprayed Buffalo Bob Smith with a seltzer bottle and played practical jokes. Keeshan had conflicts with Smith and in late 1952 left the show, or possibly was fired, after hiring an agent for himself and other workers on the show.

By September 21, 1953, Keeshan came back to local TV on WABC-TV, Channel 7 in New York City, in a new children's show, Time for Fun. He played Corny the Clown, and this time he spoke. Later that same year, in addition to Time for Fun, he began Tinker's Workshop, a program aimed at preschoolers, where he played the grandfather-like Tinker.

Developing ideas from Tinker's Workshop, Keeshan and his long-time friend Jack Miller submitted the concept of Captain Kangaroo to the CBS network, which was looking for innovative approaches to children's television programming. CBS approved the show, and Keeshan starred as the title character when it premiered on CBS on October 3, 1955. He described his character as based on "the warm relationship between grandparents and children". The show was an immediate success, and he served as its host for nearly three decades.

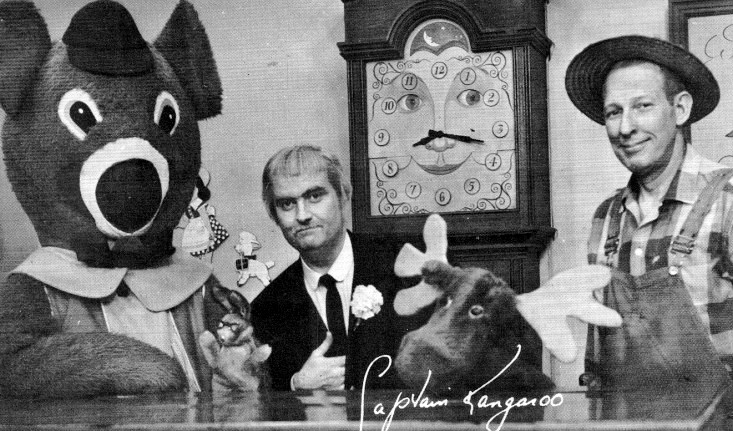
From left: Dancing Bear, Bunny Rabbit, Captain Kangaroo, Grandfather Clock, Mr. Moose, and Mr. Green Jeans

Recurring characters included his sidekick (and fan favorite) Mr. Green Jeans (played by Hugh "Lumpy" Brannum), Dennis (played by Cosmo Allegretti), and puppets such as Bunny Rabbit and Mr. Moose.

The New York Times commented: "Captain Kangaroo, a round-faced, pleasant, mustachioed man possessed of an unshakable calm ... was one of the most enduring characters television ever produced."

Keeshan also had a Saturday morning show called Mister Mayor during the 1964–65 season. Keeshan, in his role as the central characters in both Captain Kangaroo and Mister Mayor, heavily promoted the products of the Schwinn Bicycle Co., a sponsor, directly on-air to his audience. By 1972, he had introduced another character on Captain Kangaroo to recommend Schwinn products: Mr. Schwinn Dealer, due to the Federal Trade Commission ruling against children's show hosts directly endorsing their sponsor's products during their programs after 1969.

Keeshan had a longtime close friendship with Fred Rogers of Mister Rogers' Neighborhood. Each paid visits to the other's show in 1970, and they appeared together on the PBS special Springtime with Mister Rogers in 1980. The following year, Rogers appeared briefly in Keeshan's TV special Good Evening, Captain (following Keeshan's 1981 heart attack); Rogers and Dick Clark presented Keeshan with flowers at the end of the show.

Keeshan did voice recordings for a number of albums for Columbia Records, Golden Records and RCA-Victor. Several were of children's songs performed with other characters from Captain Kangaroo, but other albums included A Child's Introduction to Jazz, narration for Peter and the Wolf conducted by Leopold Stokowski, and Captain Kangaroo Introduces You to the Nutcracker Suite.

== Heart attack and retirement ==
Keeshan suffered a severe heart attack just moments after stepping off a plane at Toronto Pearson International Airport on July 11, 1981, which pushed the start of a revamped version of his show back to at least mid-August. He had come to the city to accept a children's service award.

Keeshan underwent triple-bypass surgery and received an estimated 5,000 get-well wishes from fans during his hospitalization.

Following the heart attack, Keeshan received three Emmy Awards for Outstanding Performer in 1982, 1983, and 1984. Despite these accolades, Keeshan's show was shortened from its hour-long format to 30 minutes in 1981, to make room for the expansion of the CBS Morning News lineup. The program was retitled Wake Up with the Captain, and moved to a new 7:00 am time slot. At the start of 1982, the show was rescheduled to an even earlier slot of 6:30 am. In the fall of 1982, CBS installed it as a weekend-only hour offering, and two years later, in the fall of 1984, the show became a Saturday half-hour entry.

Tired of CBS's constant reductions of his show, Keeshan left Captain Kangaroo when his contract with the network ended in December 1984, just nine months shy of the show's 30th anniversary. By 1987, repeats of the show were airing daily on many PBS stations.

Keeshan's show was given a farewell of sorts with Captain Kangaroo and Friends, a primetime network TV special that aired in 1985.

== Later life ==
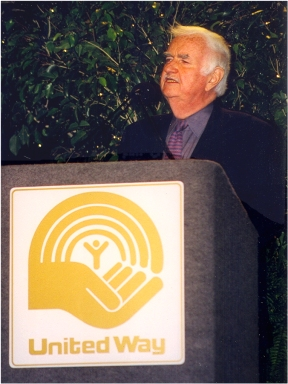
Bob Keeshan speaking for United Way at Bok Tower Gardens in Lake Wales, Florida, in April 1999

After Captain Kangaroo ended, Keeshan hosted 1985's CBS Storybreak, which featured animated versions of children's literature. He appeared in framing sequences for the animated stories, showcasing the book versions and suggesting similar books for the viewers to seek out. In 1987, he founded Corporate Family Solutions with former Tennessee governor and United States Secretary of Education Lamar Alexander, which provided day-care programs to businesses. The company later merged with Bright Horizons to create what became the nation's largest provider of worksite day care.

He was a strong advocate against video game violence and took part in congressional hearings in 1993. He also joined with parents' groups in the 1980s who protested children's TV shows based on toys like He-Man and Transformers, feeling that toys turned into TV shows did not teach children anything about the real world. He also made a rare film appearance in The Stupids in 1996.

In 1997, he starred as the Wizard in the St. Louis Muny outdoor theater production of The Wizard of Oz.

In the 1990s, Keeshan expressed an interest in bringing back a new version of Captain Kangaroo as a gentler and kinder answer to the violent cartoons on children's television. Despite having sponsors and television stations lined up, he was unable to obtain permission from ICM, the company that owned the rights to Captain Kangaroo at that time. In 1994, Keeshan was featured as a semi-regular on the FX daytime talk show Breakfast Time.

== Personal life ==
Keeshan was married to Anne Jeanne Laurie Keeshan for 45 years, until her death February 25, 1996. They had three children: Michael Derek, Laurie Margaret, and Maeve Jeanne.

Keeshan resided on Melbury Road in Babylon, Long Island, New York, before moving to spend the last 14 years of his life in Norwich, Vermont, where he became a children's advocate, as well as an author. His memoirs, Good Morning, Captain, were published in 1995 by Fairview Press. Bob Keeshan died in Windsor, Vermont, on January 23, 2004, at age 76. He was buried in Saint Joseph's Cemetery in Babylon, New York.

Keeshan's grandson, Britton Keeshan, became the youngest person at that time to have climbed the Seven Summits by climbing Mount Everest in May 2004. He carried photographs of his grandfather on that ascent, and he buried a photo of the two of them at the summit.

== Awards ==
Keeshan received many honors and awards, including:

- Iris Award for man of the year from NATPE (1965)
- Adopted member of the Dartmouth College Class of 1942
- Honorary Doctorate of Humane Letters, Alfred University (1969)
- Honorary Doctor of Pedagogy, Rhode Island College (1969)
- Honorary doctorate, Dartmouth College (1975)
- Honorary Doctor of Humane Letters, Fordham University (1975), his alma mater
- Honorary Doctor of Literature, Indiana State University (1978)
- Honorary Doctor of Laws, Elmira College, 1980
- Honorary Doctor of Laws, Marquette University (1983)
- Honorary Doctor of Humane Letters, Le Moyne College (1983)
- Honorary Doctor of Professional Studies, Central Michigan University (1984)
- Honorary doctorate, College of New Rochelle (1985), after serving for several years on its board of trustees
- Honorary Doctor of Humane Letters, St. Joseph College (1987)
- Honorary doctorate, Middlebury College, the alma mater of his grandson Britton Keeshan, for his work in children's literacy
- Honorary Fellow, American Academy of Pediatrics
- Five Emmy Awards (1978, 1981–1984)
- Three Peabody Awards (1958, 1972, 1979)
- National Education Award (1982)
- International Clown Hall of Fame (1990)
- Distinguished Service award, American Medical Association (1991)
- National Association of Broadcasters Hall of Fame (1998)
