= Mr. Bunny Rabbit =

Puppet from Captain Kangaroo

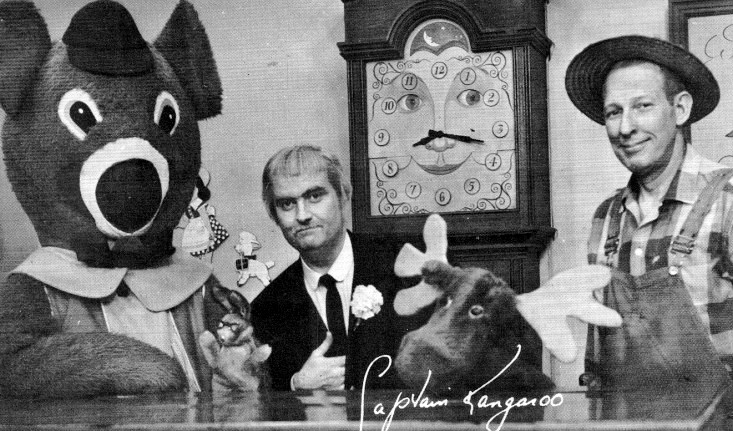
Bunny Rabbit, shown second from left

Bunny Rabbit was a puppet character on the children's television show Captain Kangaroo. Bunny Rabbit wore horn-rimmed glasses, and would trick the Captain into giving him his carrots. Bunny Rabbit was a hand puppet created and manipulated by Cosmo Allegretti.

The hand puppet is now in the collection of the National Museum of American History, part of the Smithsonian Institution museums.
