= Pat Cashin =

American clown

- Born: 1968
- Died: 2016 (aged 47–48)

Pat Cashin (1968–2016) was an American professional clown and actor who obtained the rights to the character Captain Kangaroo with the intention of reviving the television show. Cashin was a graduate of the Ringling Brothers and Barnum & Bailey Clown College. In addition to his work as a clown, he also acted, including an advertisement for Visa, and ran the "Clown Alley" blog.

His death in 2016, at age 48, effectively ended the proposed revival of the new Captain Kangaroo program, but the character has since been put up for sale by his estate.
