= John Cashin =

John Cashin may refer to:

- John L. Cashin Jr. (1928–2011), American civil rights campaigner and politician
- John M. Cashin (1892–1970), United States federal judge
