= Fergus Cashin =

British journalist

- Born: 1924
- Died: 2005 (aged 80–81)
- Occupations: Journalist; theatre critic; biographer
- Notable work: Mae West (biography); Richard Burton (co-written biography)

Fergus Cashin (1924–2005) was a British journalist who wrote mostly theatrical reviews. He wrote a controversial biography of Mae West, but is also known for the ironic phrase "This one will run and run", which he originally used in a review of a play that quickly closed, and which was subsequently made popular by the satirical magazine Private Eye.

Contemporaries knew him as a larger than life, hard-drinking smoker who charmed everybody. His journalism career ended in the 1970s after an altercation with his editor. He co-wrote a biography of Richard Burton. He died in a retirement home in 2005.
