= Debbie Weems =

American actress (1950-1978)

- Weems in Captain Kangaroo, 1975
- Born: Deborah Weems; February 1, 1950; Houston, Texas, U.S.
- Died: February 22, 1978 (aged 28); Manhattan, New York City, U.S.

Deborah Weems (February 1, 1950 - February 22, 1978) was an American actress and singer. She is best remembered for her recurring roles on the children's television program Captain Kangaroo.

== Biography ==
=== Early life ===
Debbie Booth Weems was born in Houston, Texas to Benjamin and Rowene Weems. Debbie was the second of three girls. During her childhood her parents divorced and each remarried. A half-sister was born of her mother's second marriage. Two half-sisters and a stepsister were a part of her father's second marriage. Her mother and stepfather later relocated to Marlin Texas.

Weems attended the Boston Conservatory of Music for two years ('68/'70) where she captured leading roles in two major productions - Carnival and Once Upon A Mattress. Weems later moved to New York City, where she appeared in an Off Broadway musical, Godspell. Weems was also a regular stock player at the Lakewood Musical Playhouse in Barnesville, Pennsylvania during 1971. At Lakewood Debbie played Daisy in On a Clear Day You Can See Forever, Princess Winnifred in Once Upon a Mattress, Cleo in The Most Happy Fella, and Meg Brockie in Brigadoon. She was originally scheduled to play the small role of Sally Cato in Mame, but due to the sudden departure of the original leading lady, Debbie assumed the lead role of Mame with only one day of rehearsal before opening night. Weems also appeared in various commercials.

=== Captain Kangaroo ===
From 1973 to 1978, Weems appeared as a regular on the hit CBS daily children's series, Captain Kangaroo. In 1976, songs from the television series sung by Weems were released on an album, Debbie Weems Sings Songs from Captain Kangaroo, published by Wonderland Records. She was later featured in an article in the October 23, 1976 edition of TV Guide, called Don’t Tell Your Mom About Debbie, which was about her career on Captain Kangaroo.

=== Final years ===
Weems suffered from typecasting, in which people always identified her as "that cute girl on Captain Kangaroo", hindering her ability to get roles for movies and TV shows geared toward the adult age group. During her tenure on the show, Weems' only other role during this time was in the 1977 movie Between the Lines, where she played a small role of "Annie One". Weems is believed to have suffered from anorexia and depression. Shortly before her death, Weems was admitted to a residential treatment facility (The Country Place) in Connecticut.

=== Death ===
On February 22, 1978, Debbie died after either jumping or falling from a building in New York City. Graveside funeral services were held at noon Saturday, February 25, 1978 at the family plot in Marlin, Texas. Her family and closest friends surrounded her at the funeral. The Reverend Allan Green, the Reverend H.B. Streater and the Rev. F.P. Goddard officiated. Debbie Weems was 28 years old.

Despite her death, episodes starring Weems continued to be televised through the summer of 1978.

== Sources ==
- Bob Keeshan, Growing Up Happy ISBN 0-425-12315-4
