= Robert Cashin (senior) =

Irish Anglican priest

Robert Cashin was an Eighteenth Century Irish Anglican priest.

He graduated from Trinity College, Dublin in 1692. His son was Prebendary of St Munchin's in Limerick Cathedral, Vicar general of the Diocese of Limerick, Ardfert and Aghadoe then Archdeacon of Ardfert from 1767 to 1782.
