= Hugh Brannum =

American composer, vocalist, and actor (1910-1987)

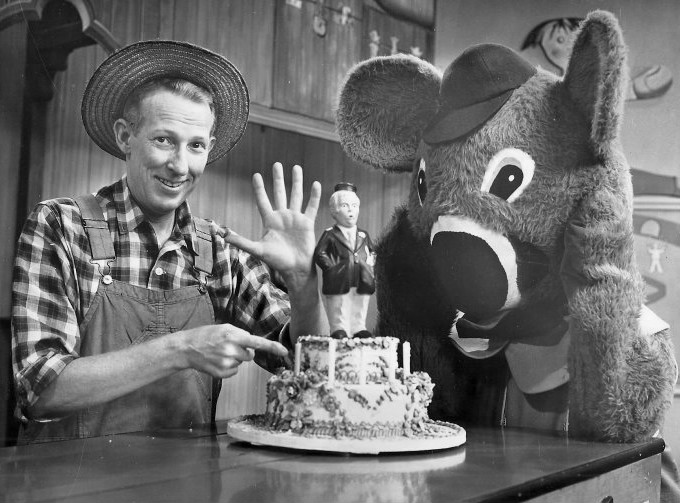
- Brannum as Mr. Green Jeans with Dancing Bear (Cosmo Allegretti) in 1960.
- Born: January 5, 1910; Sandwich, Illinois, U.S.
- Died: April 19, 1987 (aged 77); East Stroudsburg, Pennsylvania
- Other name: Lumpy
- Years active: 1951–1984

Hugh Brannum (January 5, 1910 – April 19, 1987) was an American vocalist, arranger, composer, and actor known for his role as Mr. Green Jeans on the children's television show Captain Kangaroo. During his days with Fred Waring and his Pennsylvanians, Brannum used his childhood nickname "Lumpy".

== Early years ==
Brannum was born in Sandwich, Illinois, in 1910 to a Methodist minister. He attended Maine Township High School in suburban Chicago, where he played sousaphone in the school's marching band, later learning the bass violin.

Brannum went to college at University of Redlands, where he became interested in jazz; after graduation in 1931, he played bass in various bands.

== Career ==
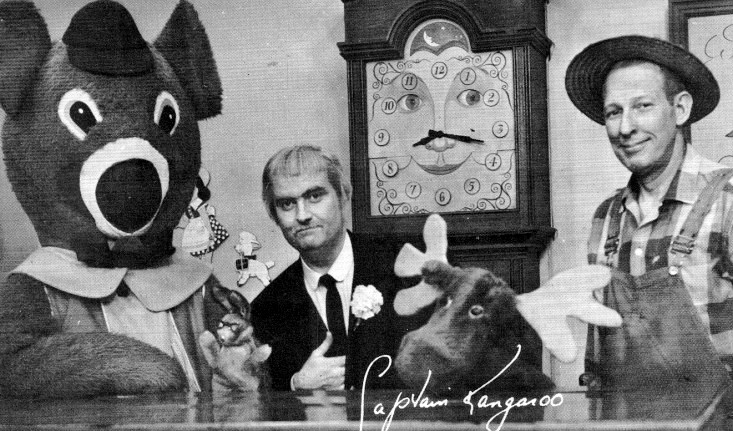
Keeshan (left) and Brannum on set

During World War II, Brannum enlisted in the US Marine Corps and joined a Marine band led by Bob Crosby. After the war, he joined the Four Squires, and later moved to Fred Waring and His Pennsylvanians; Waring's group had a regular radio show on NBC, where Brannum met fellow marine Bob Keeshan, who was working at the network, and who later hired Brannum for Captain Kangaroo.

Before his time on Captain Kangaroo, Brannum hosted a local children's TV series called Uncle Lumpy's Cabin, seen weekday afternoons at 5 on WJZ-TV, (now WABC-TV) in New York City during the 1951 season.

Mr. Green Jeans earned his moniker from his distinctive apparel, a pair of farmer's overalls (later, jeans and a denim jacket) in his signature green (although, since the show was broadcast in black-and-white until 1967, this was lost on viewers during its first years). He was a talented and inquisitive handyman who provided assistance at the Treasure House. He frequently visited the Captain with the latest addition to his menagerie of zoo animals.

Aside from Mr. Green Jeans, Brannum played a number of characters on Captain Kangaroo from 1955 to 1984, including the Professor, Greeno the Clown, the New Old Folk Singer, and Mr. Bainter the Painter. His role as Mr. Green Jeans was partly based on stories about a farm kid named "Little Orley" that he told with the Fred Waring orchestra, on the radio and on 78-rpm records under the pseudonym "Uncle Lumpy". According to Bob Keeshan, Mr. Green Jeans was an extension of Brannum's real personality. During one episode of Captain Kangaroo, a lion cub bit Brannum's finger and drew blood. Brannum stuck his bleeding hand into his pocket and never broke character for the remainder of the episode.

== Personal life and death ==
Brannum's first wife was Marjorie Ellen Homan; the couple married in 1931 and had a son, Thomas, born in 1935. Brannum married Joan Pilkington in 1973.

Brannum died of cancer in East Stroudsburg, Pennsylvania, on April 19, 1987.

== In popular culture ==
- A long-running but incorrect rumor claims Brannum was the father of musician Frank Zappa, apparently because of a Zappa composition titled "Son of Mr. Green Genes" on his 1969 album, Hot Rats.
- Along with Bob Keeshan, he is mentioned in the Jim Lehrer novel The Phony Marine.

== Discography ==
Soloist and/or composer and/or arranger, as Hugh (Lumpy) Brannum, on the following Fred Waring recordings:

- Get Well
- Little Orley and His Coonskin Cap
- Little Orley and His Fly-Frog-Fish Orchestra
- Little Orley and the Cricket
- Little Orley and the Happy Bird
- Little Orley and the Haunted House
- Little Orley and the Little Engine
- Little Orley's Barn Dance
- Little Orley's Big Concert
- Little Orley–His Adventures as a Worm
- Little Orley–His Adventures with Dr. Feather
- Little Orley–His Adventures with the Cloud
- Little Orley–His Adventures with the Parade
- Little Rhumba Numba, The
- Orley and the Bubble Gum
- Orley and the Bull Fiddle
- Orley and the Ivy
- Orley and the Moon
- Orley and the Pancake
