= Norm Cashin =

Australian rules footballer

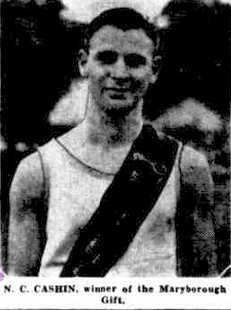
- Cashin in 1937

Personal information
- Full name: Norm Cashin
- Born: 15 July 1915
- Died: 21 July 1969 (aged 54)
- Original teams: Tarwin Lower & Glenhuntly Amateurs
- Height: 179 cm (5 ft 10 in)
- Weight: 74 kg (163 lb)

Playing career^{1}
Years	Club	Games (Goals)
1936–1937	Carlton	14 (0)
- ^{1} Playing statistics correct to the end of 1937.

Norm Cashin (15 July 1915 – 21 July 1969) was an Australian rules footballer who played with Carlton in the Victorian Football League (VFL).
