= Luke Gernon =

Irish judge

Luke Gernon (c.1580 – c.1672) was an Irish judge who held office in seventeenth-century Ireland. He is best remembered today for his manuscript (which seems to have been a private letter) called A Discourse of Ireland. The Discourse was written in 1620, and was first published in 1904.

He had several notable descendants, including his grandson, the poet Nicholas Brady, and Maziere Brady, a long-serving Lord Chancellor of Ireland in the nineteenth century.

== Career ==
In view of his later eminence, it is surprising how little is known of Gernon's family background or his early life. He was certainly English by birth and was most likely a native of Hertfordshire, but nothing seems to be known of his parents. He was probably the Lucas Gernon who entered Lincoln's Inn in 1604; afterwards, he is said to have served for a time as a soldier. He arrived in Ireland in about 1619, in which year he was admitted to the King's Inn. In the same year he became second justice of the Provincial Court of the Lord President of Munster, of which he gives some interesting details in his Discourse. He lobbied, unsuccessfully, to be appointed a judge of one of the courts of common law, which would have enabled him to move to Dublin, which has always been the centre of Irish political and social life (although the Irish capital did not impress him: "it resembles Bristol but falls short" he wrote).

He lived for many years in Limerick, a city which, like other residents and travellers of the time, he praised for its wealth and beauty, and he remained there until the outbreak of the Irish Rebellion of 1641. Gernon and his family suffered greatly during the Rebellion, as we know from his petition in 1653 to Oliver Cromwell, in which he acknowledges Cromwell's lawful authority as ruler of England and Ireland, and asks again for a pension, which it seems had already been promised but never paid. Gernon states that he had lost an estate worth £3000 (a considerable sum at the time); that he and his wife and four small children had been forced to "travel in depth of winter through the woods and bogs", and as a result, one child starved to death and Mrs. Gernon lost the use of her limbs. On this occasion the pension was paid, no doubt because the petition was supported by Roger Boyle, 1st Earl of Orrery and by James Ussher, Archbishop of Armagh, who seems to have been a close friend of Mrs. Gernon.

At the Restoration of Charles II, Gernon, like most of the Irish judges who had acknowledged the authority of Cromwell, was pardoned for his disloyalty, and his pension from Cromwell of 100 marks a year was continued by the new Government. He was not restored to his old office of second justice in Munster, which was given to John Nayler, but this is hardly surprising since he was now at least 80 years old. The office of Lord President of Munster, and the provincial Court of Munster, were abolished in 1672: Gernon may still have been alive then, although he was dead in 1673 when probate of his estate was granted to Thomas Sheridan, who was not a family member but the estate's principal creditor. In his later years, he lived mainly in Cork.

== Family ==
Although Archbishop Ussher praised Mrs Gernon highly, calling her "a lady of quality", little else seems to be known of her, apart from the fact that she had a family connection with Henry Pierrepont, 1st Marquess of Dorchester, which was useful to her husband. From Luke's petition to Cromwell for redress, we know that they had four children, of whom one died young as a result of the family's sufferings in the Rebellion of 1641. A surviving daughter, Martha, married Major Nicholas Brady and was the mother of Nicholas Brady (1659–1726), co-author with Nahum Tate of New Version of the Psalms of David (1696), a metrical version of the Psalms. A later distinguished descendant of Gernon was Maziere Brady (1796–1871), Lord Chancellor of Ireland.

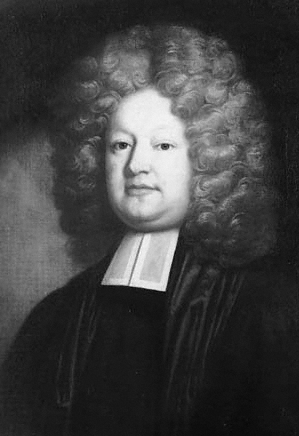
Nicholas Brady, poet and Psalmist, grandson of Luke Gernon

== A Discourse of Ireland (1620) ==
The manuscript called A Discourse of Ireland, first published in 1904, seems to have originally been a long letter which Gernon wrote to an unnamed friend in England. The tone of the Discourse is generally friendly to the Irish people but it is also somewhat condescending, and written entirely from the viewpoint of an English colonist. Gernon, unlike many Englishmen of his era, did not regard the Irish people as being either savage or uncivilised, but believes that they will benefit from English influences; rather coarsely, Ireland is described as a young woman or "nymph" who needs to be "occupied". Significantly he heaps praise on Richard Boyle, 1st Earl of Cork, for many years the dominant English settler in Munster, (and whose son Lord Orrery was his friend and patron), especially for his improvements to the recently founded town of Bandon (although Lord Cork was not, as he sometimes claimed, the actual founder of Bandon).

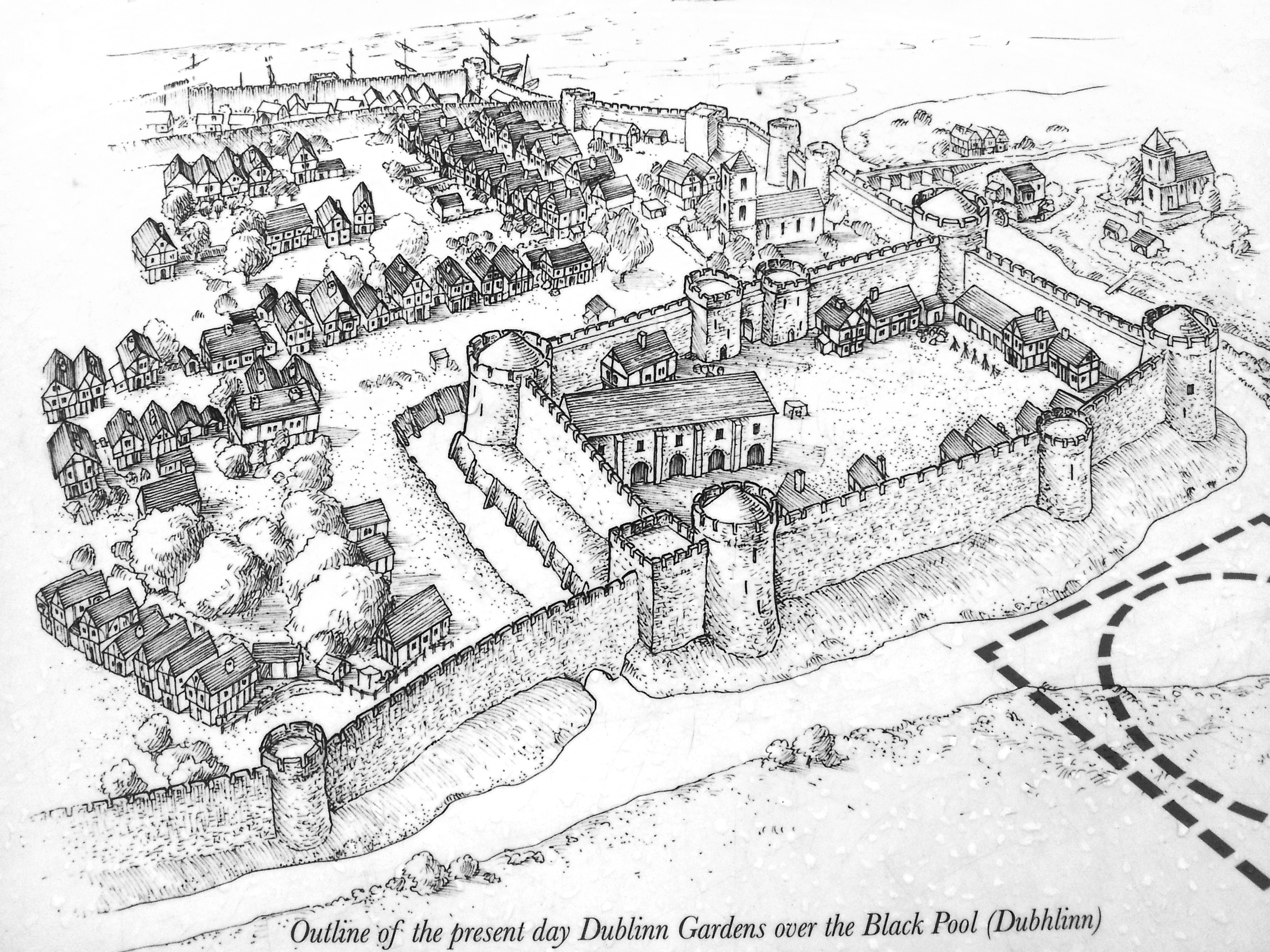
Dublin Castle

There are short but valuable descriptions of the principal Irish towns (although he admits that his descriptions of Galway, Derry and Coleraine which he never visited, are based on hearsay). Dublin, which he compares unfavourably to Bristol, is not surprisingly described in more detail than the others: he notes that Dublin is the most frequented place in Ireland, but gibes that this is "more for convenience than Majesty". There is a sketch of Dublin Castle ("our Whitehall"), by which Gernon was rather impressed: the Castle was encircled by "a huge and mighty wall four square and of incredible thickness, and (there are) many fair buildings within". There are also descriptions of the two Cathedrals: St Patrick's Cathedral is the more "vast and ancient", but Christchurch is in better repair. He also describes Trinity College Dublin, and the original Four Courts (forerunners of the present Four Courts, though they were located on the other side of the River Liffey, near Christchurch).

Limerick, his own home for many years, is also described in some detail. The bridge divides the north town from the south town, the south town (Irish Town) now being largely decayed. He praises the north town (English Town) as "magnificent" in appearance: the High Street is built of marble, in the form of a single building from one gate to another, "like the colleges in Oxford, so that at my first entrance it did amaze me", although he cannot resist a gibe about the dirt and foul smells. (A Spanish visitor in 1584 had given a similarly flattering picture of the city, though without reference to the dirt). He praises St. Mary's Cathedral: "not large but very lightsome, and by the providence of the Bishop (Bernard Adams) fairly beautified within, and as gloriously furnished with singing and organs". King John's Castle was the seat of the Provincial Court of Munster, of which Gernon was a member (this helps date the document to 1620), and of which he gives a brief portrait.

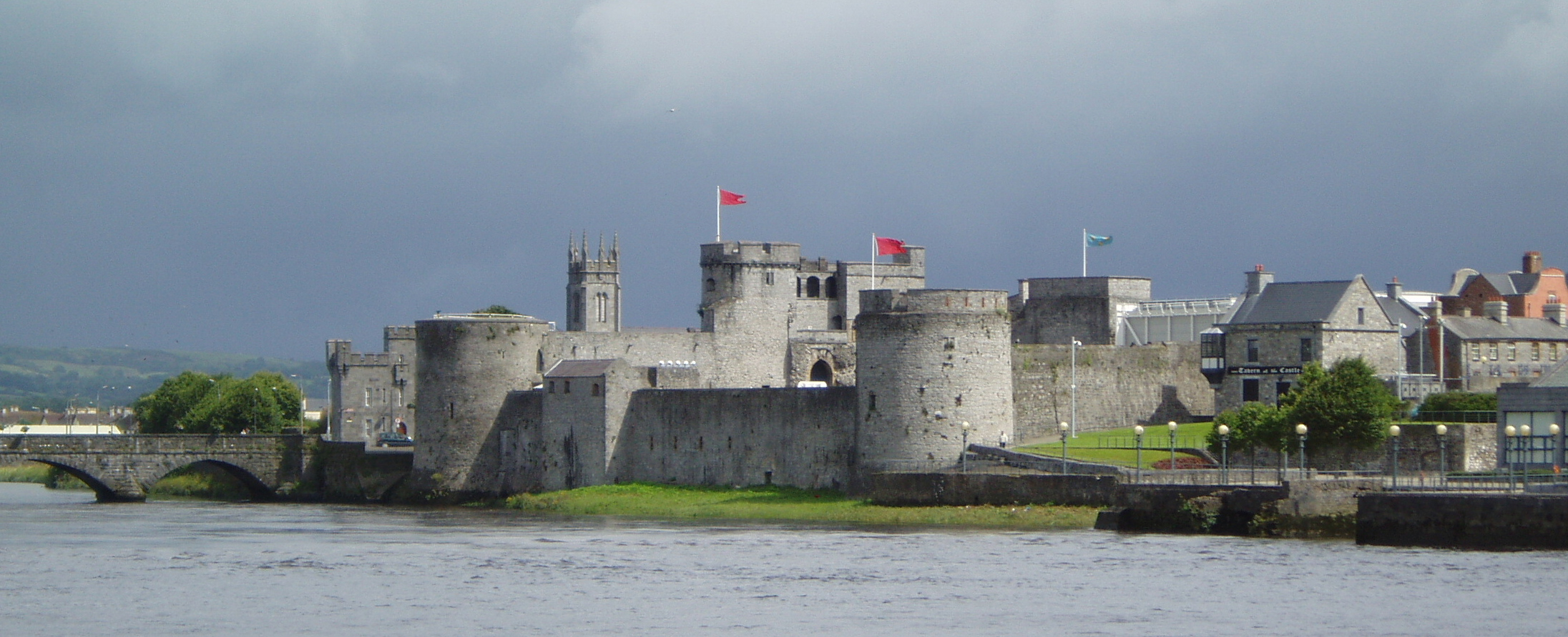
King John's Castle, Limerick, seat of the Lord President of Munster

He defends the Irish people against the charge of being savages: "be not afraid – the Irishman is no cannibal to eat you up nor lousy Jack to offend you". He does deplore the general standard of cleanliness among the Irish, and dislikes Irish food, although he found the roast mutton tolerable, and enjoyed Irish whiskey. The principal Irish fault in his view is a certain servility of manner, which, perhaps surprisingly, he acknowledges as being natural in a conquered people. Irish women, he praises highly for their beauty, charm and virtue, although he regretted that they age more quickly than English women do. Their virtue, he noted, does not prevent them from drinking with male guests, while it is customary for the men to kiss all the women present. His use of the terms Bean Tí to describe the "woman of the house" and "deoch ar doras" for "drink at the door" or "the parting glass" shows that he had picked up some Gaelic phrases.

He describes in detail the Irish style of dress, in particular, the distinctive fringed mantle worn by the men, and the interior of the typical Irish tower house: "they are built very strong, with narrow stairs, for security". This description is based mainly on his visit to Barryscourt Castle, Carrigtwohill, home of the de Barry family. His views on the Irish weather were mixed: he praises the climate for its mildness, but deplores the constant rain. The rain as he points out is more than simply a nuisance: in the previous summer (1619) there was such heavy rain that the harvest failed (although England in the early 1620s also suffered several bad harvests due to wet weather).

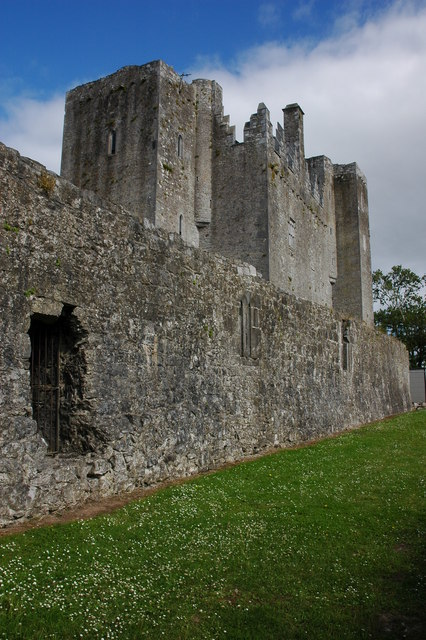
Barryscourt Castle

== Sources ==
- Barnard, J. and McKenzie, D.F The Cambridge History of the Book in Britain Vol. IV 1557–1695 Cambridge University Press 2002
- Coward, Barry The Stuart Age - England 1603–1714 2nd Edition Longman Group London 1994
- Gernon, Luke A Discourse of Ireland (1620) C.L. Falkiner ed. (1904)
- Kenny, Colum King's Inns and the Kingdom of Ireland Irish Academic Press Dublin 2000
- Suranyi, Anna The Genius of the English Nation-Travel Writing and National Identity in Early Modern England Rosemont Publishing and Printing Corp. 2008
