= Lucius Henry O'Brien =

Lucius Henry O'Brien may refer to:

- Sir Lucius O'Brien, 3rd Baronet (1731–1795), Irish politician
- Lucius O'Brien (priest) (1842–1913), Dean of Limerick in the Church of Ireland

== See also ==
- Lucius O'Brien (disambiguation)
