= St Mary's Cathedral, Limerick =

Medieval Cathedral in Limerick, Ireland

Saint Mary's Cathedral
- The Cathedral Church of the Blessed Virgin Mary, Limerick
- Ardeaglais Mhuire, Luimneach
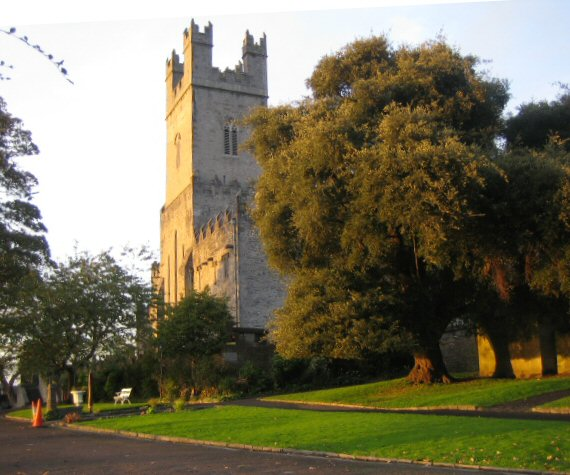

- Location within Ireland
- 52°40′06″N 8°37′24″W
- Location: Bridge Street, Limerick
- Country: Ireland
- Denomination: Church of Ireland
- Previous denomination: Roman Catholic
- Churchmanship: High Church
- Website: https://www.saintmaryscathedral.ie/

History
- Founded: 1168
- Founder: King Domhnall Mhor O'Brien
- Dedication: Mary (mother of Jesus)

Architecture
- Functional status: In use
- Heritage designation: Grade 1
- Architectural type: Church
- Style: Gothic
- Groundbreaking: c.1168

Specifications
- Capacity: 300

Administration
- Province: Province of Dublin
- Diocese: Tuam, Limerick and Killaloe

Clergy
- Bishop: Michael Burrows (bishop)
- Dean: Niall Sloane Avril Gill (chapter verger) Victor Brown (people's churchwarden)

Saint Mary's Cathedral, Limerick, is a cathedral of the Church of Ireland in Limerick, Ireland, which is dedicated to the Blessed Virgin Mary. It is in the ecclesiastical province of Dublin. Previously the cathedral of the Diocese of Limerick, Ardfert and Aghadoe, it is now one of six cathedrals in the Diocese of Tuam, Limerick and Killaloe.

== From the foundation to the Irish Reformation ==
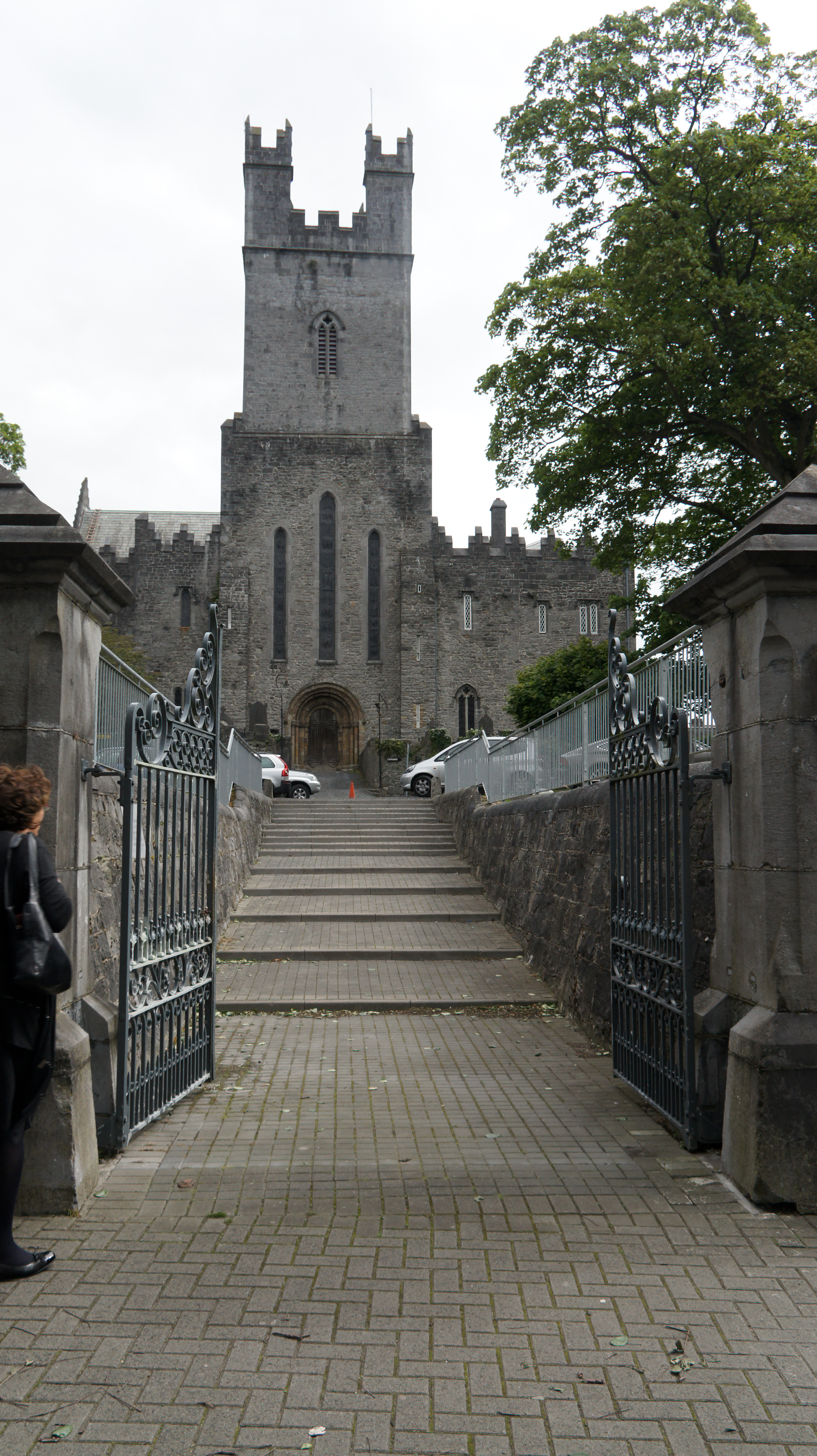
The Cathedral tower

Limerick Cathedral (Saint Mary's) is dedicated to the Blessed Virgin Mary and was founded in 1168 and is the oldest building in Limerick which is in use. It has the only complete set of misericords left in Ireland.

In 1111, the Synod of Ráth Breasail decided that "Saint Mary's church" would become the cathedral church of the Diocese of Limerick. According to tradition, Domnall Mór Ua Briain, the last King of Munster, founded the present cathedral on the site of his palace on King's Island in 1168. The palace had been built on the site of the Viking meeting place, or "Thingmote" – the Vikings' most westerly European stronghold. This had been the centre of government in the early medieval Viking city. Parts of the palace may be incorporated into the present structure of the cathedral, most prominently the great west door, which is claimed to have been the original main entrance to the royal palace. The bishops of Limerick have for centuries knocked on this door and entered by it as part of their installation ceremony. According to tradition, during the many sieges of Limerick the defenders of the city used the stones around the west door to sharpen their swords and arrows, and the marks they made in the stonework can be seen there today.

The tower of Saint Mary's Cathedral was added in the 14th century. It rises to 36.58 metres (120 feet), containing a peal of 8 bells, of which 6 were cast by John Taylor & Co, Loughborough, and 2 cast in Whitechapel, London. The tower also contains a stationary service bell, which can be rung from the ground floor.

== Notable burials ==
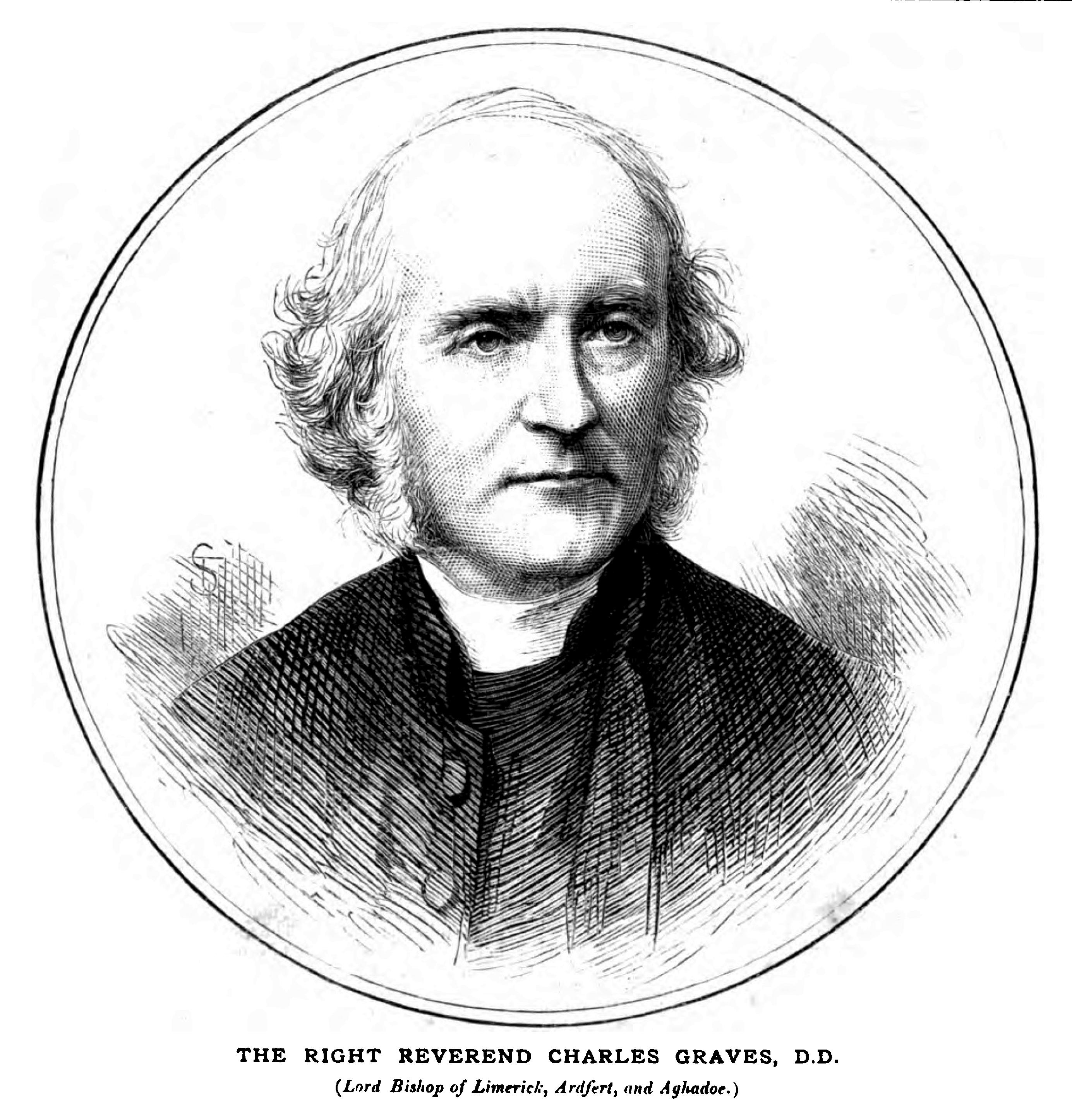
Bishop Charles Graves

The cathedral graveyard contains many graves and tombs of notable people. The physician Samuel Crumpe is buried in the graveyard near the great west door. Prince Milo of Montenegro, Frances Condell (first woman Mayor of Limerick) and Bishop Charles Graves are also interred in the grounds. The last High King of Munster, Domnall was purportedly buried in the cathedral, with the remnants of his stone coffin still visible in the Cathedral chancel. Bishop Cornelius O'Dea is buried alongside several other Bishops of Limerick in what is believed to be an Episcopal vault underneath the chancel itself. Also notable are the Sexton, Barrington, Boyd and Vanderkiste tombs along the south entrance pathway.

== From the Irish Reformation to the 19th century ==
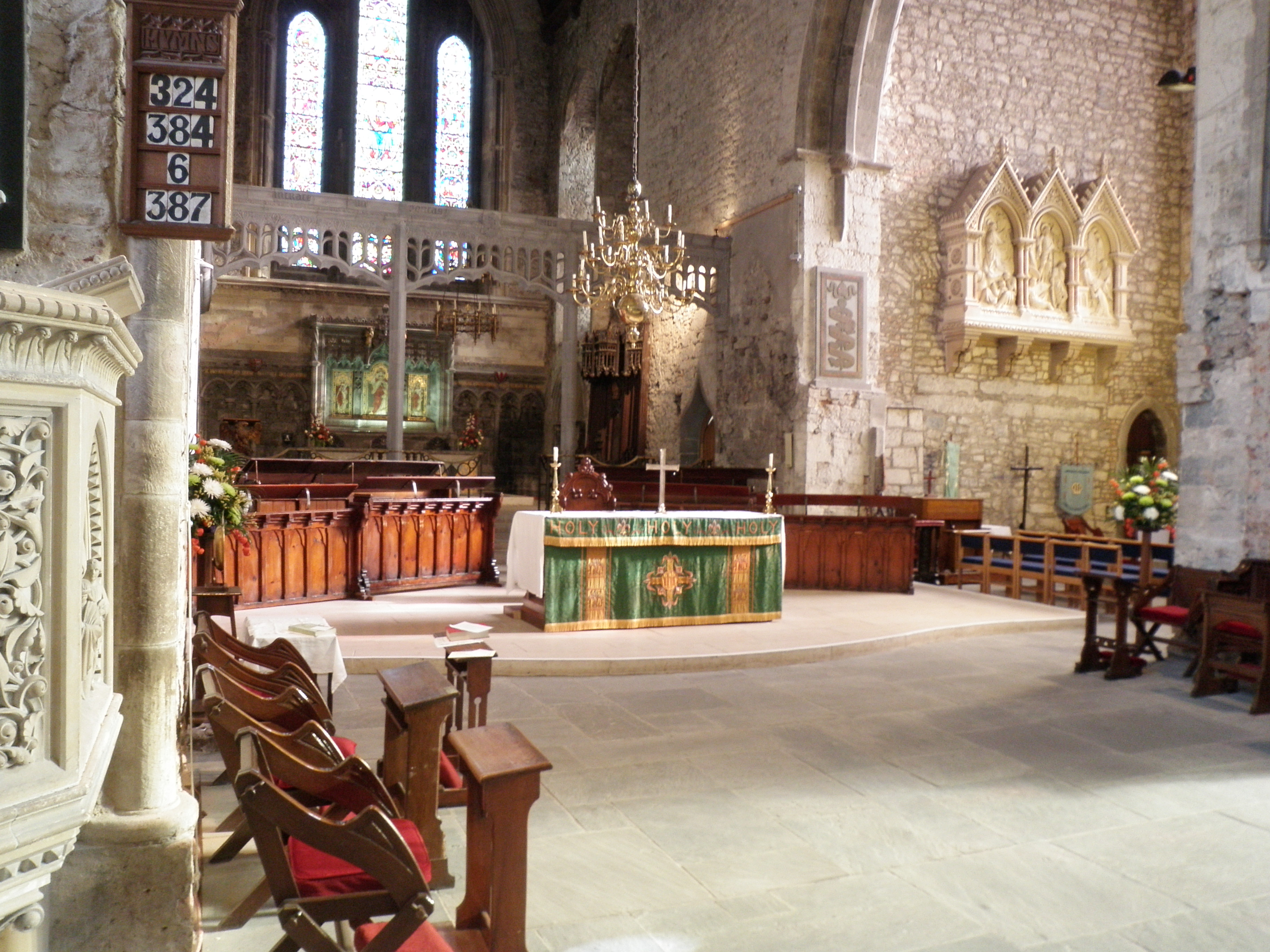
Altar of the cathedral

There are five chandeliers which hang from the ceiling. These are only lit on special occasions. The larger three of the five were made in Dublin and presented in 1759 by the Limerick Corporation. The belfry holds a peal of eight bells, six of which were presented by William Yorke, mayor of Limerick, in 1673. An active team of bell ringers travels the country to compete with other campanologists. Saint Mary's received its organ in 1624, when Bishop Bernard Adams donated one. It has been rebuilt over the centuries and was most recently renovated in 1968 and 2005.

In 1620 the English-born judge Luke Gernon, a resident of Limerick, wrote a flattering description of the cathedral:

"not large, but lightsome, and by the providence of the Bishop fairly beautified within, and as gloriously served with singing and organs".

During the Irish Confederacy wars, the cathedral was briefly transferred to Roman Catholic hands. The bishop of Limerick, Richard Arthur, was buried in the cathedral in 1646.

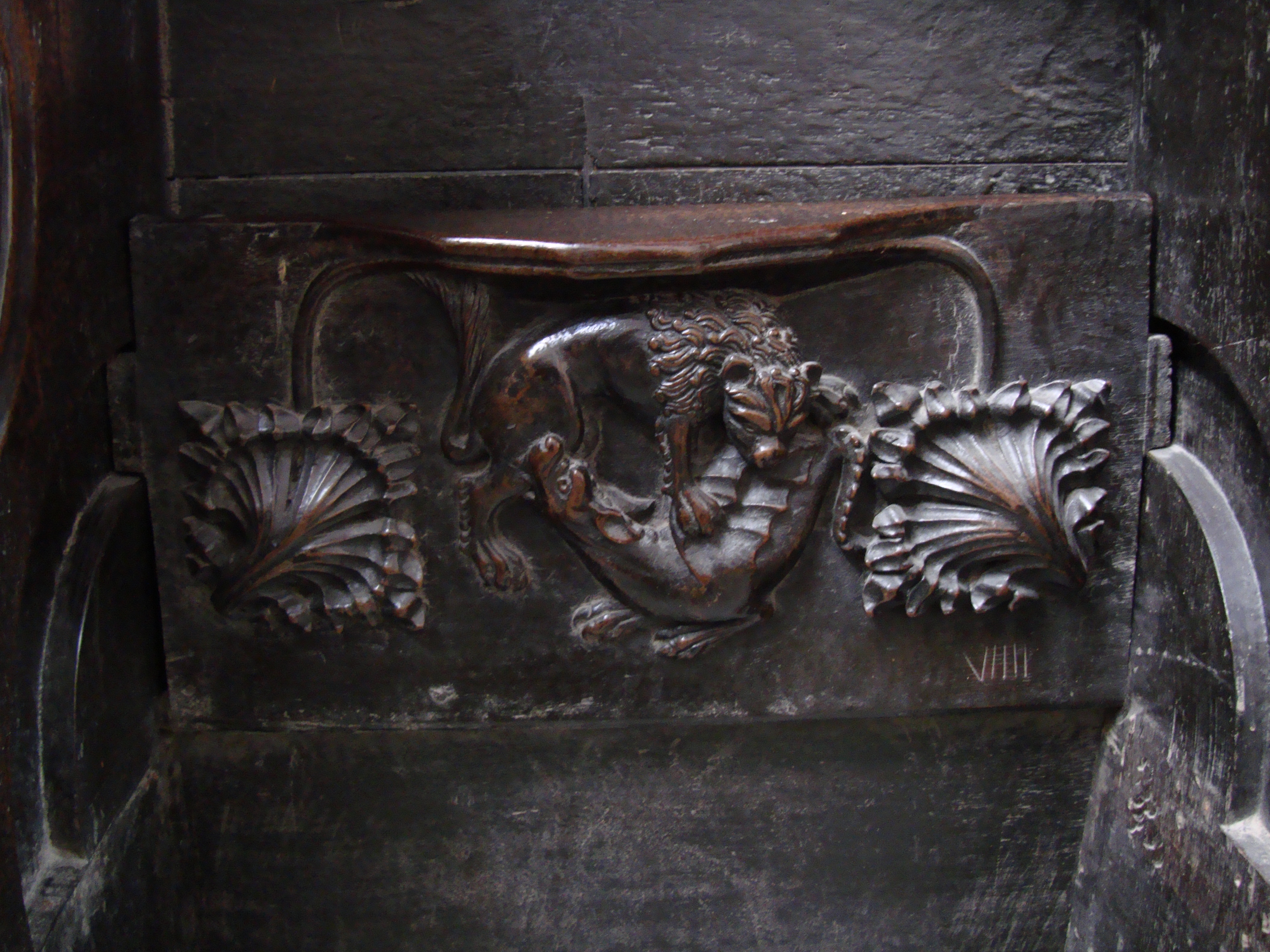
Choir misericords

In 1651, after Oliver Cromwell's forces captured Limerick, the cathedral was used as a stable by the parliamentary army. This misuse was short lived, but was a similar fate to that suffered by some of the other great cathedrals during the Cromwellian campaign in Ireland. The troops also removed the cathedral's original 4-metre (13 foot) Pre-Reformation high altar from the cathedral. The altar was only reinstated in the 1960s. It is the largest such altar in Ireland and the UK, carved from a single limestone block. The altar is used for communion services at major festivals and remains in its historic location in what is now the chapel of the Virgin Mary or Lady chapel.

In 1691, the cathedral suffered considerable damage, particularly on the east end, during the Williamite Siege of Limerick. After the Treaty of Limerick, William granted £1,000 towards repairs. There are cannonball from 1691 in the Glentworth Chapel/Saint George's Chapel inside.

== From the 19th century to the 20th century ==
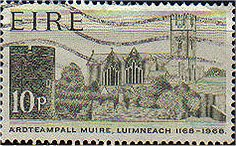
Postage Stamp from 1968

In 1968, the Irish Government commissioned two postage stamps to commemorate the cathedral's 800-year anniversary. A picture of one of the stamps is displayed on this page. In 1991, there was a large £2.5 million restoration programme which was completed in 1996 with the excavation and re-laying of the floors as well as the installation of underfloor central heating. Restoration continues today to a lesser degree.

== From the 20th century to the 21st century ==
Today, the cathedral is still used for its original purpose as a place of worship and prayer for everybody. It is also the 3rd biggest tourist attraction in Limerick. It is open to the public every day from 9:00 am to 4:45 pm. For Tourists there is a €5 admission charge upon entry. This money is essential for the upkeep of the building, and without it, the cathedral simply could not function.

Following the retirement of the Very Rev'd Maurice Sirr on 24 June 2012, Bishop Trevor Williams announced the appointment of the Reverend Sandra Ann Pragnell as Dean of Limerick and Rector of Limerick City Parish. She was the first female dean of the cathedral and rector of Limerick City Parish, and retired in January 2017.

It was announced on 27 August 2017, that the Reverend Canon Niall James Sloane was to become the 63rd Dean of Limerick and the new rector of Limerick City Parish; with his installation and institution taking place on 21 October 2017 in the cathedral.

The cathedral grounds holds a United Nations Memorial Plaque with the names of all the Irish men who died while serving in the United Nations Peacekeepers.

== See also ==
- Dean of Limerick and Ardfert List of deans of Limerick (and Ardfert)
