= Gilbert Holmes =

Gilbert Holmes may refer to:

- Gilbert Holmes (priest)
- Gilbert Holmes (actor)
