= William Bourchier =

William Bourchier may refer to:

- William Bourchier (priest) (1852–1924), Dean of Cashel
- William Bourchier, 1st Count of Eu (1374–1420), English knight
- William Bourchier, 9th Baron FitzWarin (1407–1470), English nobleman
- William Bourchier, 3rd Earl of Bath (1557–1623), Lord Lieutenant of Devon
