= Joseph Talbot =

Joseph Talbot may refer to:

- Joseph E. Talbot (1901–1966), U.S. Representative from Connecticut
- Joseph C. Talbot (1816–1883), bishop of the Episcopal Diocese of Indiana
- Joseph Talbot (priest), Dean of Cashel, 1924–46
- Joe Talbot, American filmmaker
- Joe Talbot (singer), musician

== See also ==
- Joseph Talbott (1933–2014), American politician
