= Metrical psalter =

Kind of Bible translation

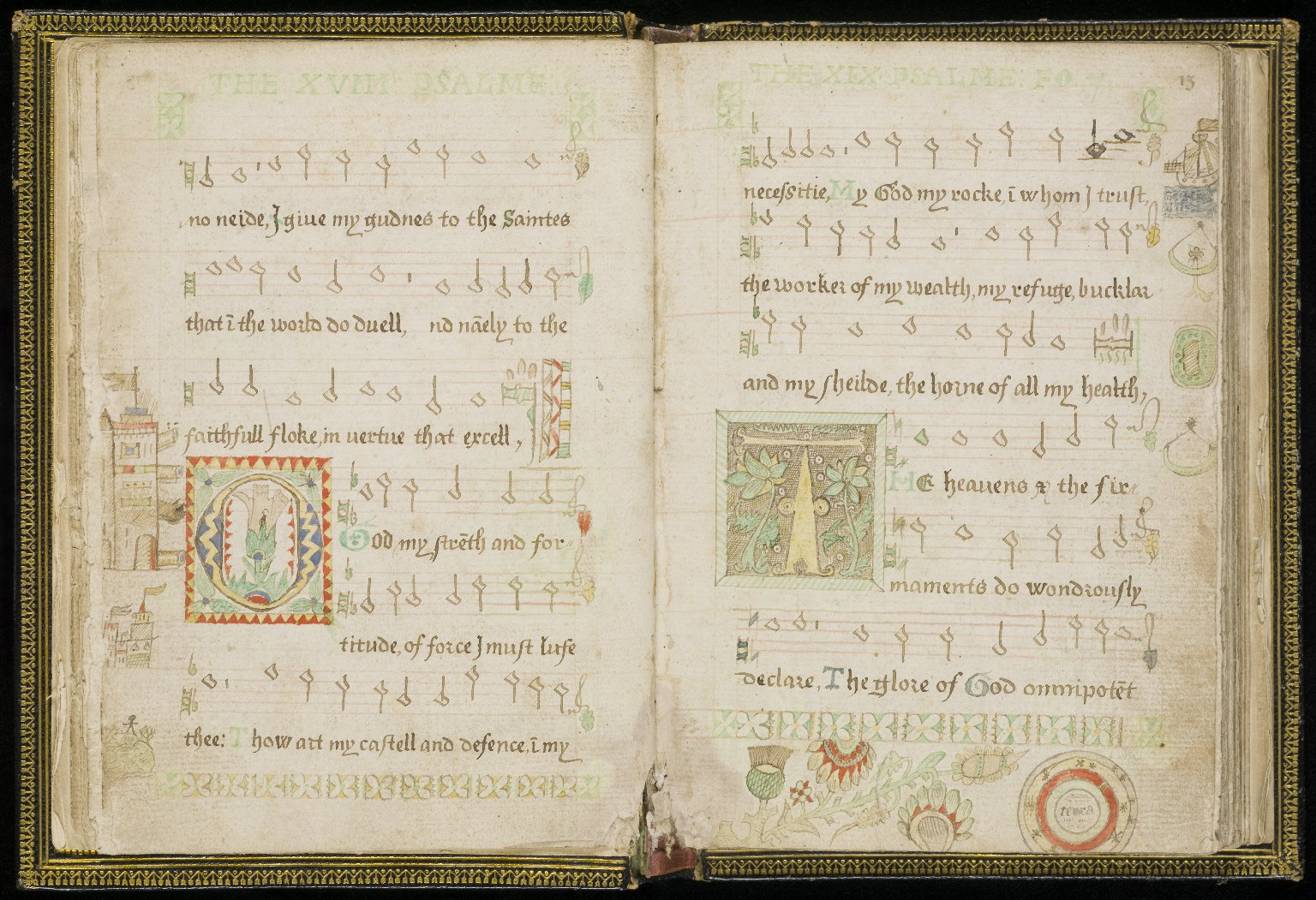
An example of a 16th-century metrical psalter

A metrical psalter is a kind of Bible translation: a book containing a verse translation of all or part of the Book of Psalms in vernacular poetry, meant to be sung as hymns in a church. Some metrical psalters include melodies or harmonisations. The composition of metrical psalters was a large enterprise of the Protestant Reformation, especially in its Calvinist manifestation that is still practiced today.

== Biblical basis ==
During the Protestant Reformation, a number of Bible texts were interpreted as requiring reforms in the music used in worship. The Psalms were particularly commended for singing. In particular, John Calvin said,

When we have looked thoroughly everywhere and searched high and low, we shall find no better songs nor more appropriate to the purpose than the Psalms of David which the Holy Spirit made and spoke through him

Various Reformers interpreted certain scriptural texts as imposing strictures on sacred music. The psalms, especially, were felt to be commended to be sung by these texts. One example is James 5:13 (KJV)

"Is any merry? let him sing psalms."

(The word translated "sing psalms" in the KJV at James 5:13 is ψαλλετω. Some other versions give more general translations such as "sing praise" in the ESV.)

Another key reference is Colossians 3:16

"Let the word of Christ dwell in you richly as you teach and admonish one another with all wisdom, and as you sing psalms, hymns and spiritual songs with gratitude in your hearts to God."

The need was felt to have metrical vernacular versions of the Psalms and other Scripture texts, suitable to sing to metrical tunes and even popular song forms.

Following an interpretation of the regulative principle of worship, many Reformed churches adopted the doctrine of exclusive psalmody: every hymn sung in worship must be an actual translation of a Psalm or some other Biblical passage. Some Reformed churches, especially the Calvinists, rejected the use of instrumental music and organs in church, preferring to sing all of the music a cappella. Even today, the Reformed Presbyterian Church of North America, the Free Presbyterian Church of Scotland, and other Reformed churches of the Scottish tradition maintain this practice.

== The psalters themselves ==
During the pre-reformation days, it was not customary for lay members of a church's congregation to communally sing hymns. Singing was done by the priests and other clergy; communal singing of Gregorian chant was the function of professional choirs, or among communities of monks and nuns. The reformers, perhaps inspired by Erasmus's desire for all to know the scriptures, pursued singable versions of the Psalms and other Christian texts for the communal use of the Reformed churches.

=== The Genevan Psalter ===
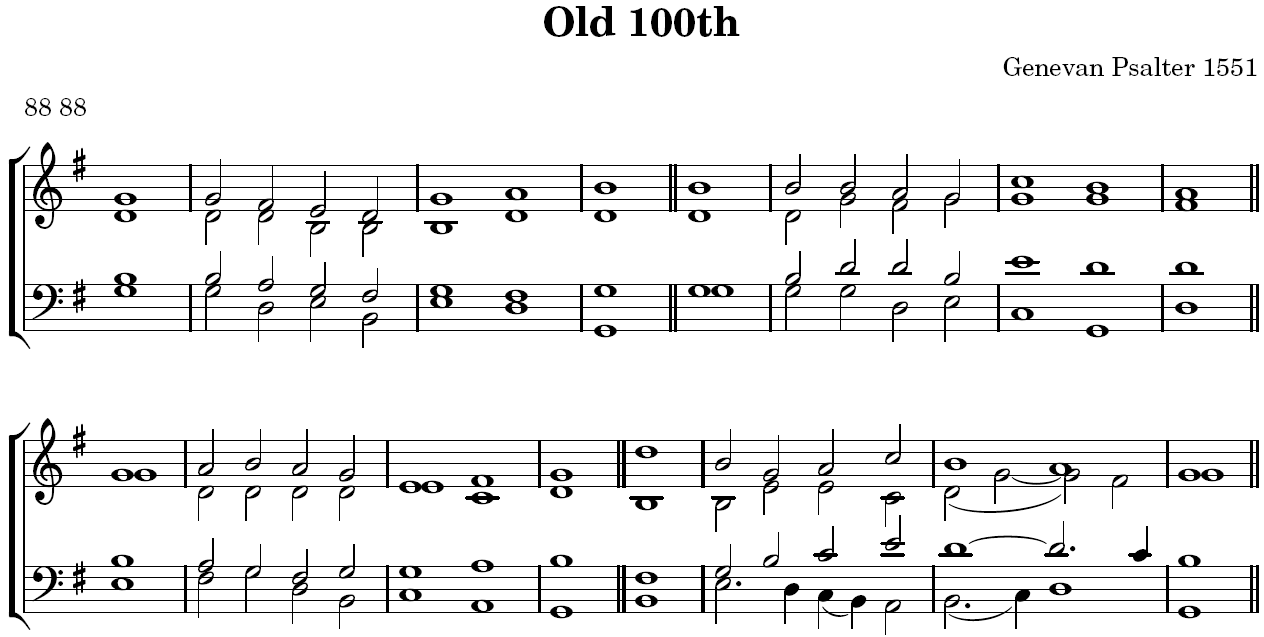
The Old 100th psalm tune, a famous tune from the Genevan Psalter (originally set to Psalm 134)

One of the greatest metrical psalters produced during the Reformation, the Genevan Psalter, was authored for the Protestant churches of France and Geneva (called the Huguenots). It has been in uninterrupted use to the present day by the Huguenot and other French-speaking Protestant churches.

The texts of the French Psalter were brought together from two independent sources: the poet Clément Marot and the theologian Théodore de Bèze (Theodore Beza). Marot and Beza's psalms appeared in a number of different collections, published between 1533 and 1543; in the latter year Marot published Cinquante Pseaumes, a collection of 50 psalms rendered into French verse. The full psalter containing all 150 canonical Psalms, plus the Nunc Dimittis, appeared in 1562.

The French psalms were set to melodies that were harmonized and altered for congregational singing. Music for the Genevan Psalter was furnished by Loys Bourgeois and others like Guillaume Franc and a certain Maistre Pierre. The composer Claude Goudimel harmonized these melodies with great variation in the complexity of the music. In some cases each part matches note for note, while others are contrapuntal or even motets. Even more elaborate musical arrangements were composed in the seventeenth century by Paschal de l'Estocart and Jan Pieterszoon Sweelinck.

An example of the Huguenot Psalter is Psalm 134 (tune given above):

Vous, saints ministres du Seigneur,
Qui, dévoués à son honneur,
Veillez la nuit dans sa maison,
Présentez-lui votre oraison.

=== The Dutch metrical psalter ===
A metrical psalter was also produced for the Calvinist Reformed Church of the Netherlands by Petrus Datheen in 1566. This Psalter borrowed the hymn tunes from the Genevan Psalter and consisted of a literal translation of Marot and Beza's French translation. The Dutch psalter was revised on orders of the Dutch legislature in 1773, in a revision which also added non-paraphrase hymns to the collection. This psalter also continues in use among the Reformed community of the Netherlands, and was recently revised in 1985. In 1968 a new metrical psalmbook appeared, which is incorporated in the Dutch hymnbook; Liedboek voor de kerken of 1973.

=== Metrical psalters in German ===
The Genevan Psalms were translated into German by Ambrosius Lobwasser (1515–1585) in 1573 "Psalter des königlichen Propheten Davids" and were sung a capella to Goudimel's harmonies for over two centuries. The Lobwasser psalms are still in use in the Amish congregations in North America, who took them with the Swiss Hymnbooks to the New World. The music edition of 1576 was reprinted in 2004, which was a result of the International Psalm Symposion in Emden. In 1798 the German pastor in Den Haag Matthias Jorissen gave out his: "Neue Bereimung der Psalmen" which replaced the old-fashioned psalm book for nearly 200 years. The present Hymnbook (1996) of the Evangelical-reformed Churches and the Old Reformed Churches of Germany contains the complete psalter with many psalms of Matthias Jorissen and other authors. It was an important decision of the synods to retain the psalms in the hymnbook with the Genevan tunes. The need and interest in the complete Jorissen- Psalter led to different new editions in 1931, 1951 and 2006. The last one was given out for singing of the people and not for scientific use only. Today, psalms make up a quarter (102) of the Protestant hymn book from 1998 in German Switzerland.

Another German psalter is the Becker Psalter.

== Metrical psalters in English ==
=== Robert Crowley ===
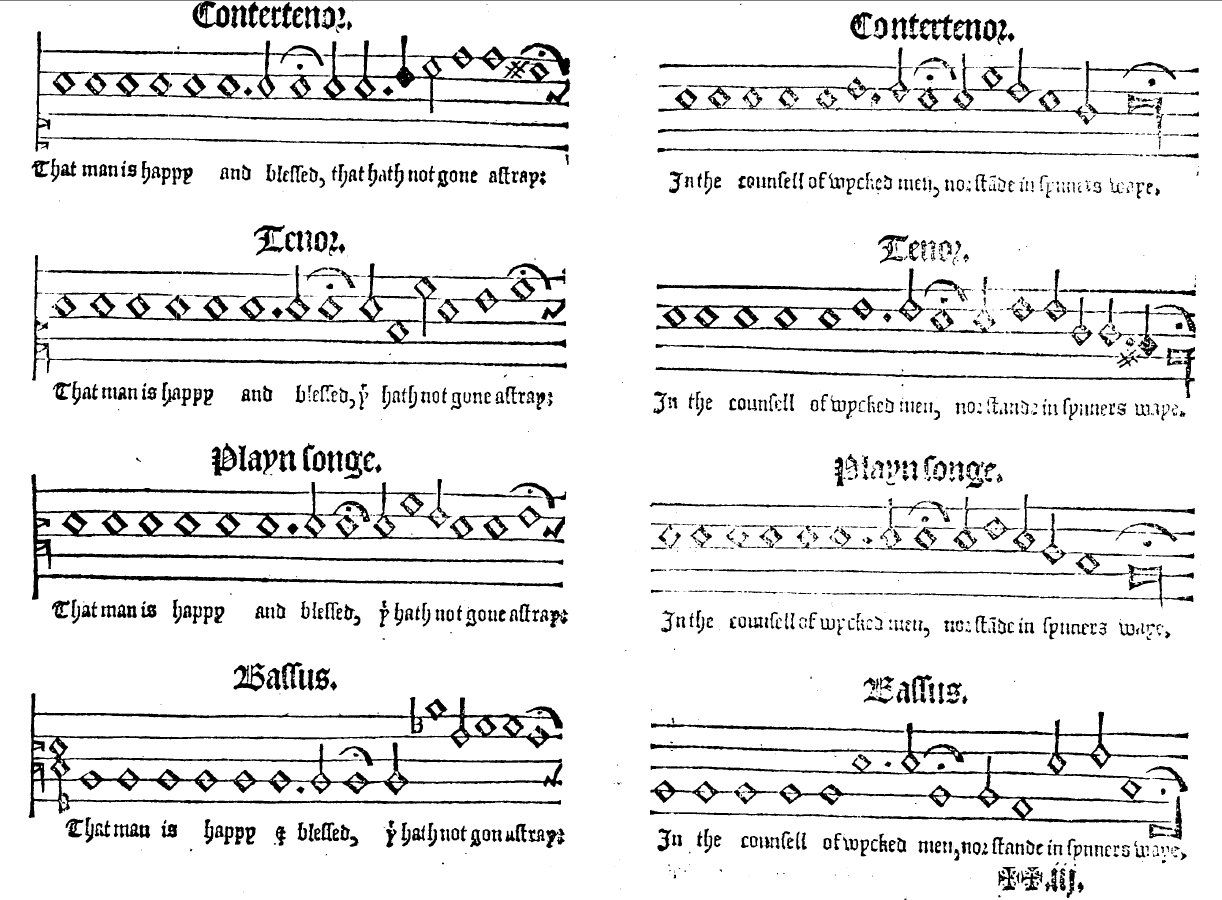
Music in Crowley's The Psalter of Dauid (1549)

The first complete English metrical psalter and the first to include musical notation was The Psalter of Dauid newely translated into Englysh metre in such sort that it maye the more decently, and wyth more delyte of the mynde, be reade and songe of al men. Printed in 1549, it was the work of Robert Crowley and was printed by him, Richard Grafton and/or Stephen Mierdman. Crowley's psalter is a rare example of two-color printing (red and black on the first four leaves) in this era, which makes it visually resemble medieval manuscript psalters. (Christopher Tye and Francis Seager later included musical notation in their psalters, and the Sternhold and Hopkins psalter eventually incorporated a basic tune with the Anglo-Genevan edition of 1556. John Day's The Whole Book of Psalmes (1562) contained sixty-five psalm tunes.) Crowley also included a calendar for calculating feast days as in the Book of Common Prayer, to which Crowley's psalter appears to be intended as a supplement.

The music provided in Crowley's psalter is similar to the Gregorian tones of the Latin Sarum Rite psalter, and it can be found in Grove's Dictionary of Music and Musicians. A single note is given for each syllable in each verse, in keeping with Archbishop Thomas Cranmer's mandate for the reformed Edwardian liturgy. The goal was to emphasize simplicity and to encourage attentiveness to what was being sung by omitting complex vocal ornamentation. In addition to the Psalms, Crowley's psalter includes English versions of the canticles Benedictus, Magnificat, Nunc Dimittis, and Benedicite, as well as the Te Deum and the Quicumque Vult. These are the Cantica Prophetarium retained in the Book of Common Prayer from the Sarum psalter—key parts of the Divine Office.

Crowley's lyrics are mainly based on Leo Jud's Biblia Sacrosancta, which was in turn a fresh translation from the Hebrew that maintained fidelity to its lyrical arrangement. Crowley rendered all the psalms in simple iambic fourteeners which conform to the single, short, four-part tune that is printed at the beginning of the psalter.

From Crowley's rendition of Psalm 24:

The earth and al that it holdeth, do to the lorde belonge:
The world and al that dwel therein as wel the olde as yonge.
For it is he that aboue al the seas hath it founded:
And that aboue the freshe waters hathe the same prepared.

For the sake of comparison, here is how the same text is rendered in contemporary English Bibles:

The earth is the Lord's, and all that therein is: the compass of the world, and they that dwell therein.
For he hath founded it upon the seas and prepared it upon the floods. (Coverdale, 1535)
The earth is Gods and all that therin is: the worlde, and they that dwell therein.
For he hath laide the foundation of it vpon the seas: and he hath set it sure vpon the fluddes. (Bishop's Bible, 1568)

The earth is the Lordes, and all that therein is: the worlde and they that dwell therein.
For he hath founded it vpon the seas: and established it vpon the floods. (Geneva Bible, 1587)

The earth is the LORD's, and the fulness thereof; the world and they that dwell therein.
For he hath founded it upon the seas, and established it upon the floods. (Authorised, 1611)

=== Sternhold and Hopkins ('Old Version') ===
Thomas Sternhold published his first, short collection of nineteen Certayn Psalmes between mid-1547 and early 1549. In December 1549, a posthumous collection was printed of Al Such Psalmes of Dauid as Thomas Sternehold ... Didde in His Life Time Draw into English Metre, which contained thirty-seven psalms by Sternhold and, in a separate section at the end, seven psalms by John Hopkins. This collection was taken to the Continent with Protestant exiles during the reign of Mary Tudor, and editors in Geneva both revised the original texts and gradually added more over several editions. In 1562, the publisher John Day brought together most of the psalm versions from the Genevan editions and many new psalms by John Hopkins, Thomas Norton, and John Markant to make up The Whole Booke of Psalmes, Collected into English Meter. In addition to metrical versions of all 150 psalms, the volume included versified versions of the Apostles' Creed, the Magnificat, and other biblical passages or Christian texts, as well as several non-scriptural versified prayers and a long section of prose prayers largely drawn from the English Forme of Prayers used in Geneva.

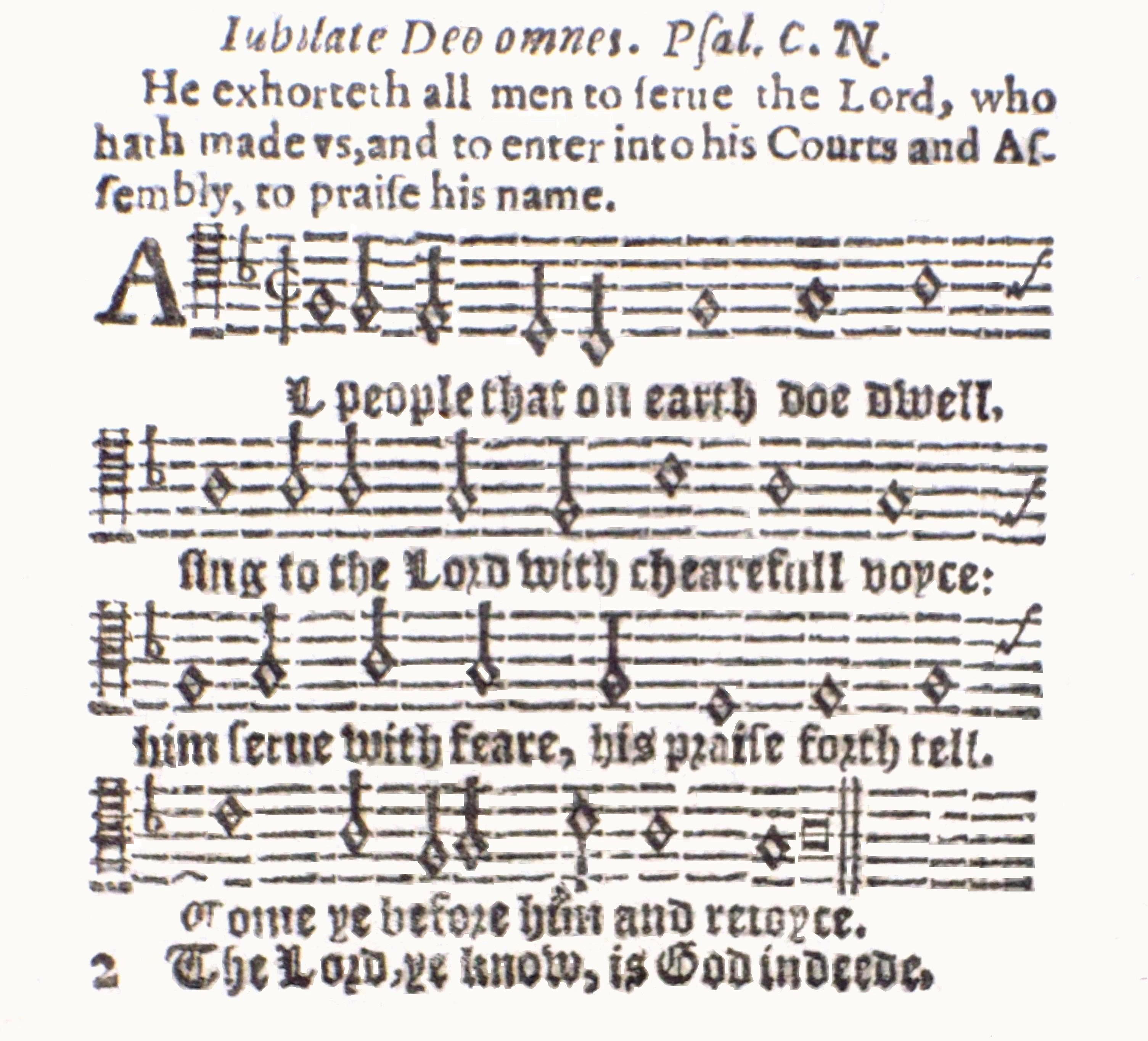
Psalm 100 in the metrical setting, from a 1628 printing of the Sternhold & Hopkins Psalter

Sternhold and Hopkins wrote almost all of their Psalms in the "common" or ballad metre. Their versions were quite widely circulated at the time; copies of the Sternhold and Hopkins psalter were bound with many editions of the Geneva Bible, and their versions of the Psalms were used in many churches. The Sternhold and Hopkins psalter was also published with music, much of it borrowed from the French Geneva Psalter. One setting from their collection that has survived is the metrical form of the Psalm 100 attributed to William Kethe, with the tune known as the Old 100th, often used as a doxology:

All people that on earth do dwell,
sing to the Lord with cheerful voice:
Him serve with fear, his praise forth tell,
come ye before him and rejoice.

In 1621, Thomas Ravenscroft published an expanded edition of the Sternhold and Hopkins Psalter; Ravenscroft's edition added many more psalm tunes, some of which had been composed, since the original publication, by leading late Tudor and early Stuart English composers such as Thomas Morley, Thomas Tallis, John Dowland, and Thomas Tomkins. Another musical contributor to this volume was John Milton, the father of the poet of that name.

By any objective measure of circulation Sternhold and Hopkins's psalter was a success. As a separate volume, it was re-printed more than 200 times between 1550 and 1640; in addition, the psalms in this form were included in most editions of the Geneva Bible, and also in most versions of the Book of Common Prayer. They continued to be in regular use in some congregations until the late eighteenth century.

Literary opinion after the sixteenth century, on the other hand, was decidedly negative. In his 1781 History of English Poetry, British poet laureate Thomas Warton called the Sternhold and Hopkins psalter "obsolete and contemptible", "an absolute travesty", and "entirely destitute of elegance, spirit, and propriety." In 1819, Thomas Campbell condemned their "worst taste" and "flat and homely phrasing." In 1757, John Wesley described the verse of Sternhold and Hopkins as "scandalous doggerel".

Sternhold and Hopkins render the beginning of the 24th Psalm in this way:

The earth is all the Lord's, with all

her store and furniture;
Yea, his is all the work, and all
that therein doth endure:
For he hath fastly founded it
above the seas to stand,
And placed below the liquid floods,
to flow beneath the land.

=== Tate and Brady ('New Version') ===
First published in 1696, the New Version of the Psalms of David was the work of Nahum Tate (who was later named poet laureate) and Nicholas Brady. A second edition was published in 1698, and supplements were issued in 1700, 1702, 1704 (twice) and 1708. Their Augustan version shows somewhat more polish than the 17th century versions.

The hymn Through all the changing scenes of life is the setting of Psalm 34 from the New Version, and As pants the hart for cooling streams is a setting of Psalm 42.

=== Isaac Watts ('Imitated') ===
Isaac Watts produced a metrical psalter, in which he breaks out of the ballad metre in his 1719 The Psalms of David, Imitated in the Language of the New Testament, and Apply'd to the Christian State and Worship, which, as the title indicates, was intended as an interpretation rather than a strict translation of the psalms. As an example of what is meant by "Language of the New Testament", Psalm 35 ("A psalm of David") verses 13-14 ("But as for me, when they were sick, my clothing was sackcloth: I afflicted my soul with fasting.... I behaved myself as though it had been my friend or my brother") becomes: "Behold the love, the gen’rous love, That holy David shows... The spirit of the gospel reigns, And melts his pious heart."

His translation of Psalm 24 into long metre begins:

This spacious earth is all the Lord's,
And men, and worms, and beasts, and birds:
He raised the building on the seas,
And gave it for their dwelling-place.

=== Other versified psalms in English ===
During the period of the English Reformation, many other poets besides Sternhold and Hopkins wrote metrical versions of some of the psalms. The first was Sir Thomas Wyatt, who in around 1540 made verse versions of the six penitential Psalms. His version of Psalm 130, the famous De profundis clamavi, begins:

From depth of sin and from a deep despair,
From depth of death, from depth of heart's sorrow
From this deep cave, of darkness deep repair,

To thee have I called, O Lord, to be my borrow.
Thou in my voice, O Lord, perceive and hear
My heart, my hope, my plaint, my overthrow.

Sir Philip Sidney made verse versions of the first 43 psalms. After he died in 1586, his sister, Mary Sidney Herbert, the Countess of Pembroke, completed the translation of the final two-thirds of the psalter. Together they used a dazzling array of stanza forms and rhyme schemes—as many as 145 different forms for the 150 psalms. The Sidney Psalter was not published in its complete form until the twentieth century, but it was widely read in manuscript, and influenced such later poets as John Donne and George Herbert.

However, poetry remains a matter of private devotion unless given a musical setting for trained choirs or for congregational singing. Rather than iambic pentameter, in England and Scotland in the 16th and 17th centuries, the overwhelming preference in rural congregations was for iambic tetrameters (8s) and iambic trimeters (6s), ridiculed in Shakespeare's A Midsummer Night's Dream, in which Nick Bottom and the other "rude mechanicals" obsess over the need for a prologue "written in eight and sixe". The three meters then in use: Common Meter (8,6,8,6), Long Meter (8,8,8,8), and Short Meter (6,6,8,6) remain in widespread use in hymnals today.

=== Other English metrical psalters ===
Later writers attempted to repair the literary inadequacies of the Sternhold and Hopkins version. The Bay Psalm Book (1640), the first book published in the British colonies in America, was a new metrical psalter:

The earth Jehovah's is,
and the fullness of it:
the habitable world, and they
that there upon do sit

Because upon the seas,
he hath it firmly laid:
and it upon the water-floods
most solidly hath stayed

In the 1640s, the English Parliamentarians Francis Rous and William Barton both authored their own metrical paraphrases. Their translations were scrutinised by the Westminster Assembly and heavily edited. Rous's original version of Psalm 24 read:

The earth is Gods, and wholly his
the fulnesse of it is:
The world, and those that dwell therein
he made, and they are his.

For firmly he hath founded it
above the sea to stand;
And laid below the liquid flouds,
to flow beneath the land.

After much alteration, a much-altered translation based on Rous's work was approved by the General Assembly of the Church of Scotland and published in 1650 as the Scottish Metrical Psalter, to be used throughout the Church of Scotland. In this psalter, the common metre was ubiquitous:

The earth belongs unto the Lord,
and all that it contains;
The world that is inhabited,
and all that there remains.

For the foundations thereof
he on the seas did lay,
And he hath it established
upon the floods to stay.

One of the most widely known hymns in Christian worship, "The Lord's my Shepherd", is a translation of Psalm 23 appearing in the 1650 Scottish Psalter. But by the time better metrical psalms were made in English, the belief that every hymn sung in church had to be a Biblical translation had been repudiated by the Church of England. A flowering of English hymnody had occurred under writers such as Isaac Watts and Charles Wesley, but their hymns were freed from the stricture that each verse had to be a translation of a scriptural text. Attitudes towards the Biblical text itself had also changed, with closer emphasis being paid on its exact phrasing. This new regard for the letter of the Biblical text diminished the appeal of the psalters' previous versions; those who sang them no longer felt they were singing Scripture. The success of these newer hymns has largely displaced the belief that each hymn must be a direct translation of Scripture. Now, many hymnals contain Biblical references to the passages that inspired the authors, but few are direct translations of Scripture like the metrical psalters were.

== Metrical psalter in Gaelic ==
The Scottish Gaelic Psalter was produced by the Synod of Argyll. By 1658, the first fifty psalms had been translated into ballad metre due to the work of Dugald Campbell, John Stewart, and Alexander McLaine. A manuscript of the final 100 psalms was produced in 1691 with the entire Gaelic psalter, with revisions to the 'first fifty' being produced in 1694. The Gaelic Metrical Psalms are used to this day in the Scottish Highland Presbyterian Churches where the practice of lining out is used, in accordance with the Westminster Assembly of Divines Directory for Public Worship. The corpus of tunes has shrunk over the years with only about twenty-four in general use.

== Modern-day metrical psalters ==
Many churches continue to use metrical psalters today. For example, the Reformed Presbyterian Church of North America (RPCNA) produced psalm books based on the Scots Metrical Psalter, with the intention of making the words more modern and the translation more accurate. These were produced in 1889 (a split-leaf brown book), 1911 (unpopular due to musical complexity), 1920 (a green book) and 1929 (also green, an expanded version of the 1920 one), 1950 (a blue book), and 1973 (a maroon one) called The Book of Psalms for Singing. A further revision has been undertaken by the RPCNA, again for the purposes of making the words more modern, and also to replace some of the more difficult-to-sing tunes, such as Psalm 62B, with tunes that are easier to sing. The new edition, The Book of Psalms for Worship, was released in 2009.

The Reformed Presbyterian Church of Ireland, however, produced a split-leaf version of the Scots Metrical Psalter, but with additional "Alternative versions" of the words included as the second half of the book. These were culled from a number of sources, including the RPCNA books mentioned above. Whenever a new version was necessary, they merely expanded their old book, without removing any of the old translations. One of these editions was produced in 1979. They were available in staff or sol-fa. A revised Psalter in more modern idiom was published in 2004 under the title The Psalms for Singing.

The Melbourne Congregation of the Presbyterian Church of Eastern Australia produced The Complete Book of Psalms for Singing with Study Notes in 1991. Music in staff format is provided in a variety of meters, mostly to established tunes. The texts draw from the best of older versions but provide much new material.

The Free Church of Scotland published Sing Psalms in 2003, being a completely new translation. It is available in words only, and in staff and sol-fa split-leaf formats.

The Canadian Reformed Churches have published and sing from Book of Praise, the Anglo-Genevan Psalter (1961, 1972, 1984, 2014), containing English versifications for all the Genevan tunes. In 2015 Premier Printing published New Genevan Psalter which consists of the 150 Psalms as found in the Book of Praise as well as the Ten Commandments and the Songs of Mary, Zechariah and Simeon.

== Split-leaf psalters ==
A split-leaf psalter (sometimes known as a "Dutch door" psalter) is a book of Psalms in metrical form, in which each page is cut in half at the middle, so that the top half of the pages can be turned separately from the bottom half. The top half usually contains the tunes, and the bottom half contains the words. The tune and words can be matched by matching the meter; each meter is a specification of line length and (implicitly) stressed syllables; if a tune is in Common Meter, any set of Common Meter words can go with it.
