= John Pattison (priest) =

John Pattison (1851–1918) was an Anlgican priest. He served as the Dean of Ardfert from 1916 to 1918.

Pattison was educated at Trinity College, Dublin and ordained in 1884. He began his ecclesiastical career with a curacy at Kiltallagh. He was Rector of Kilcolman from 1886 to 1892; and then of Listowel until his death. He was Precentor of Ardfert Cathedral from 1905 to 1916.

He died on 15 August 1918.

Religious titles
Preceded by Robert Beatty	Dean of Ardfert; 1916–1918	Succeeded by George Edmund Power
