= George Swain (priest) =

Dean of Limerick from 1929 to 1953

George Lill Swain was Dean of Limerick from 1929 to 1953.

He was born in 1870 and educated at Trinity College, Dublin. He was ordained in 1894 and after curacies at Drummaul and Limerick worked overseas in Valencia before incumbencies at Kilkeedy, Dysert and St Michael, Limerick.

He died on 26 April 1955.

== Notes ==
Church of Ireland titles
| Preceded by Thomas Aylmer Pearson Hackett | Dean of Limerick; 1929–1953 | Succeeded by Maurice John Talbot |
