= Nicholas Brady (poet) =

Irish clergyman and poet (1659–1726)

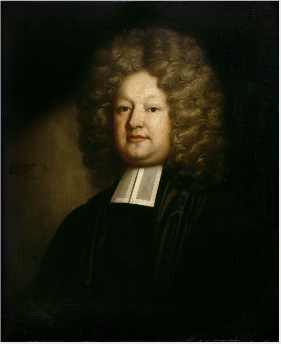
Nicholas Brady, by Hugh Howard

Nicholas Brady (28 October 1659 – 20 May 1726), Anglican divine and poet, was born in Bandon, County Cork, Ireland. He was the second son of Irishman Major Nicholas Brady (Ó Brádaigh or Mac Brádaigh) and his wife Martha Gernon, daughter of the English-born judge and author Luke Gernon (little is known of her mother); his great-grandfather was Hugh Brady, the first Protestant Bishop of Meath. He received his education at Westminster School and at Christ Church, Oxford; he had degrees from Trinity College, Dublin (BA 1685, MA 1686, BD & DD 1699)

Brady was a zealous promoter of the Glorious Revolution and suffered for his beliefs in consequence. When war broke out in Ireland in 1690, Brady, by his influence, thrice prevented the burning of the town of Bandon, after James II gave orders for its destruction following the Capture of Bandon. The same year he was employed by the people of Bandon to lay their grievances before the English parliament. He soon afterwards settled in London, where he obtained various preferments. At the time of his death, he held the livings of Clapham and Richmond.

Brady's best-known work, written with his collaborator Nahum Tate, is New Version of the Psalms of David, a metrical version of the Psalms. It was licensed in 1696, and largely ousted the old Sternhold and Hopkins Psalter. His ode Hail! Bright Cecilia, based on a similar ode by John Dryden, was written in 1692 in honour of the feast day of Saint Cecilia, patron saint of musicians. It was set to music by Henry Purcell in the same year. Like Dryden, he also translated Virgil's Aeneid, and wrote several smaller poems and dramas, as well as sermons.

He married Letitia Synge, daughter of Richard Synge and grand-daughter of George Synge, Bishop of Cloyne, and had four sons and four daughters. Notable descendants of Nicholas include Maziere Brady, Lord Chancellor of Ireland.
