= Robert Rowan (priest) =

Irish Anglican priest

The Venerable Robert Rowan
- Dean of Ardfert
- Church: Church of Ireland
- Diocese: Diocese of Limerick, Ardfert and Aghadoe
- In office: 1924 to 1946

Orders
- Ordination: 1897

Personal details
- Born: Robert Philip Rowan; 10 September 1870
- Died: 19 June 1946 (aged 75)
- Denomination: Anglicism
- Education: Trinity College, Dublin

Robert Philip Rowan (10 September 1870 – 19 June 1946) was an Irish Anglican priest. He was Dean of Ardfert from 1924 until 1946.

Rowan was educated at Trinity College, Dublin and ordained in 1897. He began his ecclesiastical career with curacies at Tralee and Wexford. He was a chaplain to the forces at Curragh and Shorncliffe then senior curate at St John's Lowestoft. After incumbencies in Castleisland, Kenmare and Killarney he was elevated to the Deanery. He was Archdeacon of Ardfert and Aghadoe and Canon of Effin from 1938 to 1943.

Religious titles
Preceded by George Edmund Power	Dean of Ardfert; 1924–1946	Succeeded by Charles Loftus Haines
