= Richard Synge (priest) =

Anglican priest (1648–1688)

Richard Synge (1648–1688) was Archdeacon of Cork from 1674 until his death.

The son of George Synge, Bishop of Cloyne, he was born in 1646 and educated at Trinity College, Dublin. He held livings at Aghinagh, Kilcolman, and Aghabullogue. He was Prebendary of Kilbrogan in Cork Cathedral from 1669 to 1671; and Chancellor of Ross from 1671 until 1674.

Richard Synge died in 1688 and left two daughters, including Letitia who married Nicholas Brady.
