= William Chadwick =

William Chadwick may refer to:

== People ==
- William Chadwick (bishop) (1905–1991), bishop of Barking, 1959–1975
- William Chadwick (footballer), English footballer for Port Vale 1901–1904
- William Chadwick (painter) (1879–1962), British-born American Impressionist painter
- William Owen Chadwick (1916–2015), British professor, writer and historian of Christianity
- Bill Chadwick (1915–2009), first U.S.-born referee to serve in the National Hockey League
- Billy Chadwick (footballer) (born 2000), English footballer

== Other ==
- USCGC William Chadwick (WPC-1150), a Sentinel class cutter of the United States Coast Guard
  - William Chadwick (USCG), namesake of the above
- Billy Chadwick, a character in the TV series CSI: Miami, played by Lew Temple

== See also ==
- William Chadwick Bourchier (1852–1924), dean of Cashel
