= James Gregg =

James Gregg may refer to:

- James M. Gregg (1806–1869), U.S. Representative from Indiana
- James Gregg (priest) (1820–1905), Dean of Limerick
