= Lucius O'Brien =

Lucius O'Brien may refer to:

- Lucius O'Brien (died 1717)
- Sir Lucius O'Brien, 3rd Baronet (1731–1795), Member of the Parliament of Ireland
- Lucius O'Brien, 13th Baron Inchiquin (1800–1872), Irish politician and nobleman
- Lucius O'Brien, 15th Baron Inchiquin (1864–1929)
- Lucius Richard O'Brien (1832–1899), Canadian painter
- Lucius O'Brien (priest) (1842–1913), Dean of Limerick in the Church of Ireland
