= James MacEwan =

Irish dean

James MacEwan was Dean of Ardfert from 1906 until his death on 10 January 1911.

MacEwan was educated at Trinity College, Dublin and ordained in 1858. He began his ecclesiastical career with a curacy at Ballymachugh. He was Curate then Vicar of Listowel until 1882 then Rector of Dromtariffe from then until 1908.

Religious titles
| Preceded by Abraham Isaac | Dean of Ardfert; 1906–1911 | Succeeded by Robert Beatty |
