= Thomas Moriarty =

Irish priest

Thomas Moriarty (1812, Dingle – 1894, Tralee) was a priest in the Church of Ireland during the nineteenth century.

Moriarty was educated at Trinity College, Dublin. Moriarty was ordained in 1837. He served curacies at Kingscourt and Ventry; and incumbencies at Dunquin, Kildrum, Tralee, Ballynacourty and Drishane. He was Treasurer of Ardfert Cathedral from 1873 to 1879; and Dean of Ardfert from 1879 to 1894.

He died on 26 April 1894.

Church of England titles
Preceded by John Godfrey Day	Dean of Ardfert; 1879–1894	Succeeded by Abraham Isaac
