= Abraham Isaac =

Irish clergyman

Abraham Isaac (1828–1906) was a clergyman in the Church of Ireland in the second half of the nineteenth century and the first decade of the twentieth.

Isaac was educated at Trinity College Dublin. Rector Valentia 183047, After a curacy at Ardfert he held incumbencies at Kilcolman, Killiney, Valentia and Kilgobbin. He was Dean of Ardfert from 1895 until his death on 4 March 1906.

Church of England titles
Preceded by Thomas Moriarty	Dean of Ardfert; 1895–1906	Succeeded by James MacEwan
