= Samuel Crumpe =

Irish medical and social writer (1766–1796)

- Born: 15 September 1766; Rathkeale
- Died: 27 January 1796 (aged 29); Limerick
- Resting place: St Mary's Cathedral, Limerick
- Education: Edinburgh University
- Known for: An Essay on the Best Means of Providing Employment for the People, 1793. An Inquiry into the Nature and Properties of Opium, 1793.
- Spouse: Susan Ingram
- Awards: Prize medal of the Royal Irish Academy
- Scientific career
- Fields: medicine, employment
- Workplaces: St. John's Hospital (Limerick)

Samuel Crumpe (1766–1796) was an Irish physician and a writer on medical and social issues.

== Life ==
Samuel Crumpe was born at Rathkeale on 15 September 1766. He was the eldest son of Daniel Crumpe and his wife and cousin, Grace, daughter of Richard Orpen of Ardtully, High Sheriff of Kerry.

In 1788, at the age of 22, he was awarded the degree of MD at Edinburgh University, with a dissertation in which he argued that scurvy could be cured by good diet. The same year he set up in practice in Limerick, where he was notable for his active service to the poor through his work at St. John's Hospital.

In 1792 he married Susan Ingram, described as an accomplished lady with a large fortune, she was the second daughter of the Rev. Jaques Ingram by his wife, the granddaughter of Thomas Smyth, Bishop of Limerick, Ardfert and Aghadoe. The couple had two children, one of whom (Mary Grace Susan Crumpe) wrote the historical novel Geraldine of Desmond: Or, Ireland in the Reign of Elizabeth. An Historical Romance in Three Volumes (1829).

Crumpe was an avid climatologist and kept a weather diary for each day of 1795.

Crumpe died in Limerick on 27 January 1796, aged 29. One obituary notice recorded that he was "a man whose rare virtues and accomplishments recommended him to the respect and esteem of a widely extended and diversified acquaintance".

== Writings ==
In 1793 Crumpe's Essay on the Best Means of Providing Employment for the People won the prize offered by the Royal Irish Academy. It was translated into French and German, as was his book on opium which appeared the same year. The work was heavily indebted to Adam Smith in its assumptions about society and economy.

Crumpe’s work on opium provided an experimental basis for classifying the drug as a stimulant rather than a narcotic, and was the first to provide an extensive discussion of withdrawal effects.

== Bibliography ==
- De Vitiis quibus Humores corrumpi dicuntur, eorumque Remediis, doctoral dissertation, 1788.
- An Essay on the Best Means of Providing Employment for the People, 1793. Second edition 1795. Available on Google Books
- An Inquiry into the Nature and Properties of Opium, 1793. Available on Google Books
- History of a Case in which very uncommon worms were discharged from the stomach, 1797 (lecture read to the Royal Irish Academy on 6 December 1794, published posthumously). Also available in the Transactions of the Royal Irish Academy, vol. 6 (Dublin, 1797).
