= Thomas Graves (priest) =

Irish clergyman

Thomas Ryder Graves (1745–1828) was a clergyman in the Church of Ireland during the 18th century.

He was the elder brother of Richard Graves, Dean of Ardagh; the grandfather of Charles Graves, Bishop of Limerick, Ardfert and Aghadoe; and the ancestor of the author Robert Graves, the playwright Clotilde Graves and writer Charles Patrick Graves. He was educated at Kilkenny College before entering Trinity College, Dublin. He was Dean of Ardfert from 1785 to 1802 when he became Dean of Connor, which office he held until 1811. His eldest son, Major-General James William Graves (1774–1845), fought at the Battle of Waterloo.

Church of England titles
Preceded by Office in abeyance	Dean of Ardfert; 1785–1802	Succeeded by Gilbert Holmes
Preceded by Richard Dobbs	Dean of Connor; 1802–1811	Succeeded by Theophilus Blakeley
