= Maurice Talbot =

Irish Anglican cleric

Maurice John Talbot was Dean of Limerick from 1954 to 1971.

He was born on 29 March 1912 into an ecclesiastical family, the second son of the Very Rev. Joseph Talbot, Dean of Cashel, and was educated at St Columba's College and Trinity College, Dublin. He was ordained in 1936 and after a curacy in Nantenan he held incumbencies at Rathkeale and then Killarney before his elevation to the Deanery.

He died 17 June 1999.

== Notes ==
Church of Ireland titles
Preceded by George Lill Swain	Dean of Limerick; 1954–1971	Succeeded by Walton Newcombe Frances Empey
