= Arthur Irwin (priest) =

19th-century clergyman

Arthur Irwin (1797–1861) was a clergyman in the Church of Ireland during the nineteenth century.

Irwin was educated at Trinity College, Dublin. He was Dean of Ardfert from 1842 to 1861. A prebendary of St Patrick's Cathedral, Dublin, he died on 7 February 1861.

Church of England titles
Preceded by Gilbert Holmes	Dean of Ardfert; 1842–1861	Succeeded by John Godfrey Day
