= Maurice Sirr =

Irish dean

The Right Reverend Maurice Sirr
- John Maurice Glover Sirr
- Church: Church of Ireland
- Successor: Sandra Ann Pragnell

Personal details
- Born: 1942 (age 83–84)
- Education: Trinity College, Dublin

John Maurice Glover Sirr (b. 1942) was Dean of Limerick and Ardfert from 1987 until 2011.

Sirr was educated at Dundalk Grammar School and Trinity College, Dublin. He was ordained Deacon in 1965 and Priest in 1966. He held curacies in Belfast then Finaghy. He was the Incumbent at Drumcliff from 1969 until 1987.

One of his brothers, William James Douglas Sirr (born 1 July 1940), was also educated at Trinity College, Dublin and ordained. He served as an RAF Chaplain but died in 1991 while resident chaplain at the RAF Church of St Clement Danes.

Church of Ireland titles
Preceded by Walton Newcombe Francis Empey/Charles Maurice Gray-Stack; Deaneries merged	Dean of Limerick and Ardfert; 1987-2012	Succeeded by Sandra Ann Pragnell
