= George Power (priest) =

Priest from 1918 to 1924

George Edmund Power was Dean of Ardfert from 1918 until 1924.

Power was educated at Trinity College, Dublin and ordained in 1893. He began his ecclesiastical career with curacies at Tralee and Dublin. He was the incumbent at Killorglin from 1900. He was Prebendary of Effin from 1924 to 1941; Canon of St Patrick's Cathedral, Dublin from 1929 to 1941; and Archdeacon of Ardfert and Aghadoe from 1941.

He died on 6 January 1950.

Religious titles
Preceded by John Pattison	Dean of Ardfert; 1918–1924	Succeeded by Robert Philip Rowan
