= Charles Gray-Stack =

Irish dean

Charles Maurice Gray-Stack (1912–1985) was Dean of Ardfert and Chancellor of St Mary's Cathedral, Limerick from 1966 until his death.

Gray-Stack was born in Armagh, educated at Trinity College, Dublin and ordained in 1939. He began his ecclesiastical career with curacies at Eglish, Clonevan, Killarney and Rathkeale. He held incumbencies at Adare from 1953 to 1961; and at Kenmare from 1961.
