= John Day (priest) =

Irish priest

John Godfrey Day (b Kiltallagh 1802- d Dublin 1879) was a priest in the Church of Ireland during the nineteenth century.

Day was born in County Kerry and educated at Trinity College, Dublin. Rector Valentia 183047, he was Rector of Kenmare from 1847 to 1857, and of Dromtariffe from 1857 to 1861; and of Ratass from 1861 when he became Dean of Ardfert. He died in post on 10 April 1879.

Church of England titles
Preceded by Arthur Irwin	Dean of Ardfert; 1861–1879	Succeeded by Thomas Moriarty
