= Mary Crumpe =

Irish novelist

- Died: 20 January 1861
- Occupation: Novelist
- Parent(s): Samuel Crumpe

Mary Grace Susanna Crumpe, Comtesse de Milon de Villiers (1790s – 20 January 1861) was an Irish novelist.

Mary Crumpe was born in the 1790s to Dr. Samuel Crumpe, a Limerick physician and author, and Susanna Ingram. She lived in Limerick, Dublin, and London.

Her first novel was a society novel called Isabel St. Albe: or, Vice or Virtue (1823).

Her second novel Geraldine of Desmond; or, Ireland in the reign of Elizabeth: An historical romance (1829) was a work of historical fiction about the Desmond Rebellions. Her publisher Henry Colburn repackaged unsold copies of the first edition as a second edition with an unusual feature, lithographs of autographs of historical figures featured in the novel, including Queen Elizabeth I. Crumpe had supplied the autographs and sued for both their return and for unpaid profits in a chancery case, Crumpe v. Colburn.

In 1845, she published a pamphlet titled Letters on Animal Magnetism, comprising a set of letters on the subject of mesmerism which had previously been published in the Polytechnic Review.

Her third novel, The Death-Flag: or, The Irish Buccaneers (1851), was set in the late 18th century and featured the Irish pirates the O'Sullivans of Berehaven.

She married Alexander Lewis Joseph, Comte Milon de Villiers in 1855.

Mary Crumpe died on 20 January 1861 in St Helier.

== Bibliography ==
- Isabel St. Albe: or, Vice or Virtue (1823)
- Geraldine of Desmond; or, Ireland in the reign of Elizabeth: An historical romance (1829)
- Letters on Animal Magnetism (1845)
- The Death-Flag: or, The Irish Buccaneers (1851)
