= Robert Beatty (dean of Ardfert) =

Irish dean

Robert Beatty was Dean of Ardfert from 1911 until 1917.

Beattie was educated at Trinity College, Dublin and ordained in 1859. He began his ecclesiastical career with a curacy at Ballymachugh. He was the incumbent at Tarbert, County Kerry from 1891 until 1911.

He died on 7 February 1921.

Religious titles
Preceded by James MacEwan	Dean of Ardfert; 1911–1916	Succeeded by John Pattison
