= Lucius O'Brien (priest) =

Irish Dean (1842–1913)

Lucius Henry O'Brien (13 August 1842 – 25 September 1913) was Dean of Limerick from 1905 to 1913.

== Biography ==
He was the son of William Smith O'Brien. He was born on 13 August 1842 and educated at St Columba's College and Trinity College, Dublin. He was ordained in 1867; and after a curacy in Mere held incumbencies at Ramelton and then Adare before his elevation to the Deanery.

He died on 25 September 1913.

== Notes ==
Church of Ireland titles
Preceded by James Fitzgerald Gregg	Dean of Limerick; 1905–1913	Succeeded by Thomas Aylmer Pearson Hackett
