= Niall Sloane =

Dean of Limerick, Church of Ireland

Niall James Sloane (born 1981) is the incumbent Dean of Limerick and Ardfert in the Church of Ireland.

Sloane was educated at Trinity College, Dublin, the Milltown Institute and the Church of Ireland Theological College. He was ordained to the diaconate in 2005 and the priesthood in 2006. He held curacies at Agherton in Portstewart and Taney before becoming rector of Holy Trinity, Killiney until his appointment as dean in 2017.

Church of Ireland titles
Preceded by Sandra Pragnell	Dean of Limerick and Ardfert; 2012-	Succeeded by Incumbent
