= Sandra Pragnell =

Irish Anglican cleric

Sandra Ann Pragnell (born 1953) was Dean of Limerick and Ardfert from 2012 to 2017.

Pragnell was educated at the University of Hull and ordained in 2002. She was curate of Castleknock then priest vicar of Christ Church Cathedral, Dublin, from 2003 to 2005 when she became the incumbent at Dundalk.

Church of Ireland titles
Preceded by Maurice Sirr	Dean of Limerick and Ardfert; 2012-2017	Succeeded by Niall Sloane
