= Tate and Brady =

1696 metrical psalm book by Nahum Tate and Nicholas Brady

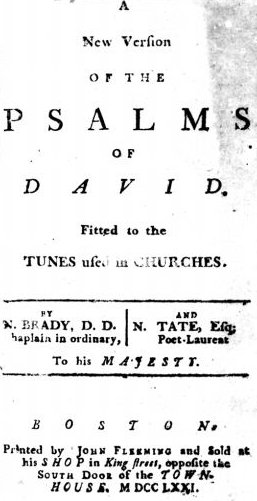
Tate and Brady's psalms (1771 Boston edition)

Tate and Brady refers to the collaboration of the poets Nahum Tate and Nicholas Brady, which produced one famous work, New Version of the Psalms of David (1696). This work was a metrical version of the Psalms, and largely ousted the old version of T. Sternhold and J. Hopkins' Psalter. Still regularly sung today is their version of Psalm 34, "Through all the changing scenes of life" (which was improved in the second edition of 1698). As well as the 150 Psalms they also wrote metrical versions of the Lord's Prayer and the Apostles' Creed.

It was dedicated to King William III who also gave his royal allowance for its use in such churches as would, "think fit to receive it."

Because of the association between the authors and the collection, the work itself is often referred to as "Tate and Brady".

Tate's well-known Christmas carol "While Shepherds Watched Their Flocks by Night" was first printed in A Supplement to the New Version of the Psalms by Dr Brady and Mr Tate, published in 1700.

By the early 1900s, it was remarked that the work, like the hymns of Isaac Watts, had "not stood the test of time", and that "Tate and Brady's psalms are not to be found in our hymnals". J. Cuthbert Hadden commented:

“it had defects which the earlier version had not. It showed a frequent weakness and wordy inflation which the Sternhold Psalter seldom exhibits. As the author of "The Minstrel" says in his Letter to Dr. Blair: "It often sinks into flatness and prose; and as often affects familiar phrase, antitheses, and other conceits that prevailed among the middling poets of its time." Archdeacon Hare writes that it "has been singularly successful in stripping the Psalms of their life and power"; and James Montgomery thinks it is at least as inanimate as the Sternhold version. In our own day there may be conflicting opinions as to the merits of the two Psalters: but at any rate, we think a fair judgment of the Tate and Brady version would be that “though not excellent, it was not intolerable." it never quite succeeded in supplanting the earlier Psalter: the present century was nearly reached before it distanced its competitor; and not long after this both versions became "reminiscences of the past."
