= Gilbert Holmes (priest) =

Irish clergyman

Gilbert Holmes (1772–1846) was a clergyman in the Church of Ireland during the late 18th century and the first four decades of the nineteenth century.

Holmes was educated at Trinity College Dublin. He was Dean of Ardfert from 1802 to 1842. He died at Kilmore, County Tipperary on 23 December 1846.

Church of England titles
Preceded by Thomas Graves	Dean of Ardfert; 1802–1842	Succeeded by Arthur Irwin
