= Bernard Adams (bishop) =

Irish-Anglican bishop

Bernard Adams (1566 – 1626) was an Anglican bishop in Ireland during the first half of the 17th century.

Adams was born in Middlesex, and was educated at Trinity College, Oxford, being made scholar in 1583 and fellow in 1588. He was consecrated Bishop of Limerick in 1604. He also held the Bishopric of Kilfenora in commendam from 1606 until 1617. He died on 22 March 1626, and was buried in St Mary's Cathedral, Limerick, which he had done much to improve and beautify; he gave the Cathedral its first organ in 1624. As a man he was praised as being liberal and pious. He seems to have been on friendly terms with the poet Anne Southwell, another English native who had settled in Ireland; her poem "Letter to Doctor Adam" is addressed to him.
