= James Gregg (priest) =

James Fitzgerald Gregg was Dean of Limerick from 1899 to 1905.

== Biography ==
He was born into an ecclesiastical family in 1820 and educated at Trinity College, Dublin. He was ordained in 1844 and after curacies at Yoxford, Kiltullagh and Collon held incumbencies in Balbriggan and Limerick before until his elevation to the Deanery.

He died on 31 October 1905.

== Notes ==
Church of Ireland titles
Preceded by Thomas Bunbury	Dean of Limerick; 1899–1905	Succeeded by Lucius Henry O'Brien
