= Dean of Limerick and Ardfert =

Position in the Church of Ireland, created 1987

The Dean of Limerick and Ardfert is a Church of Ireland official based in the Cathedral Church of St Mary's in the united diocese of Limerick, Killaloe and Ardfert.

There had been two separate deans, Dean of Limerick and Dean of Ardfert, until the position was united in 1987. The Dean of Ardfert had been based at Ardfert Cathedral (a.k.a. St Brendan's Cathedral), until it was destroyed by fire in 1641.

The current incumbent, since 2017, is The Very Reverend Niall Sloane.

== List of deans of Limerick ==
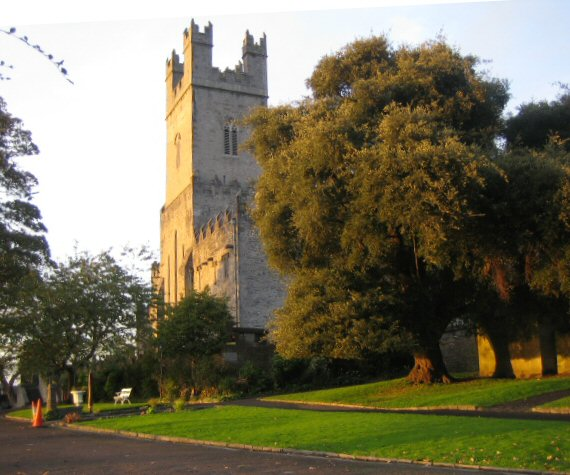
Limerick Cathedral

- 1588–1603 Denis Campbell (appointed Bishop of Derry, Raphoe and Clogher but died before consecration in 1603)
- 1603–1635 George Andrew (afterwards Bishop of Ferns and Leighlin 1635)
- 1635–1635 Michael Wandesford (afterwards Dean of Derry 1635)
- 1635 Henry Sutton
- 1640 Robert Naylor
- 1661–1666 Richard Boyle (afterwards Bishop of Ferns and Leighlin 1666)
- 1666–1679 John Smith (afterwards Bishop of Killala and Achonry 1679)
- 1679 Thomas Hynde
- 1692–1704 Ezechiel Webbe
- 1704 George Water Story
- 1721 Thomas Bindon
- 1740–1766 Charles Massy
- 1766–1771 John Averell (afterwards Bishop of Limerick, Ardfert and Aghadoe 1771)
- 1771–1809 Maurice Crosbie
- 1809–1844 Arthur John Preston
- 1844–1849 William Higgin (afterwards Bishop of Limerick, Ardfert and Aghadoe 1849)
- 1849–1868 Anthony Kirwan
- 1868–1872 Maurice Day (afterwards Bishop of Cashel and Waterford 1872)
- 1872–1899 Thomas Bunbury (afterwards Bishop of Limerick, Ardfert and Aghadoe 1849)
- 1899–1905 James Gregg
- 1905–1913 Lucius O'Brien
- 1913–1928 Aylmer Hackett
- 1929–1953 George Swain
- 1954–1971 Maurice Talbot
- 1971–1981 Walton Empey (afterwards Bishop of Limerick and Killaloe, 1981)
- 1981–1986 George Chambers

See below for Deans of Limerick and Ardfert

== Deans of Ardfert ==
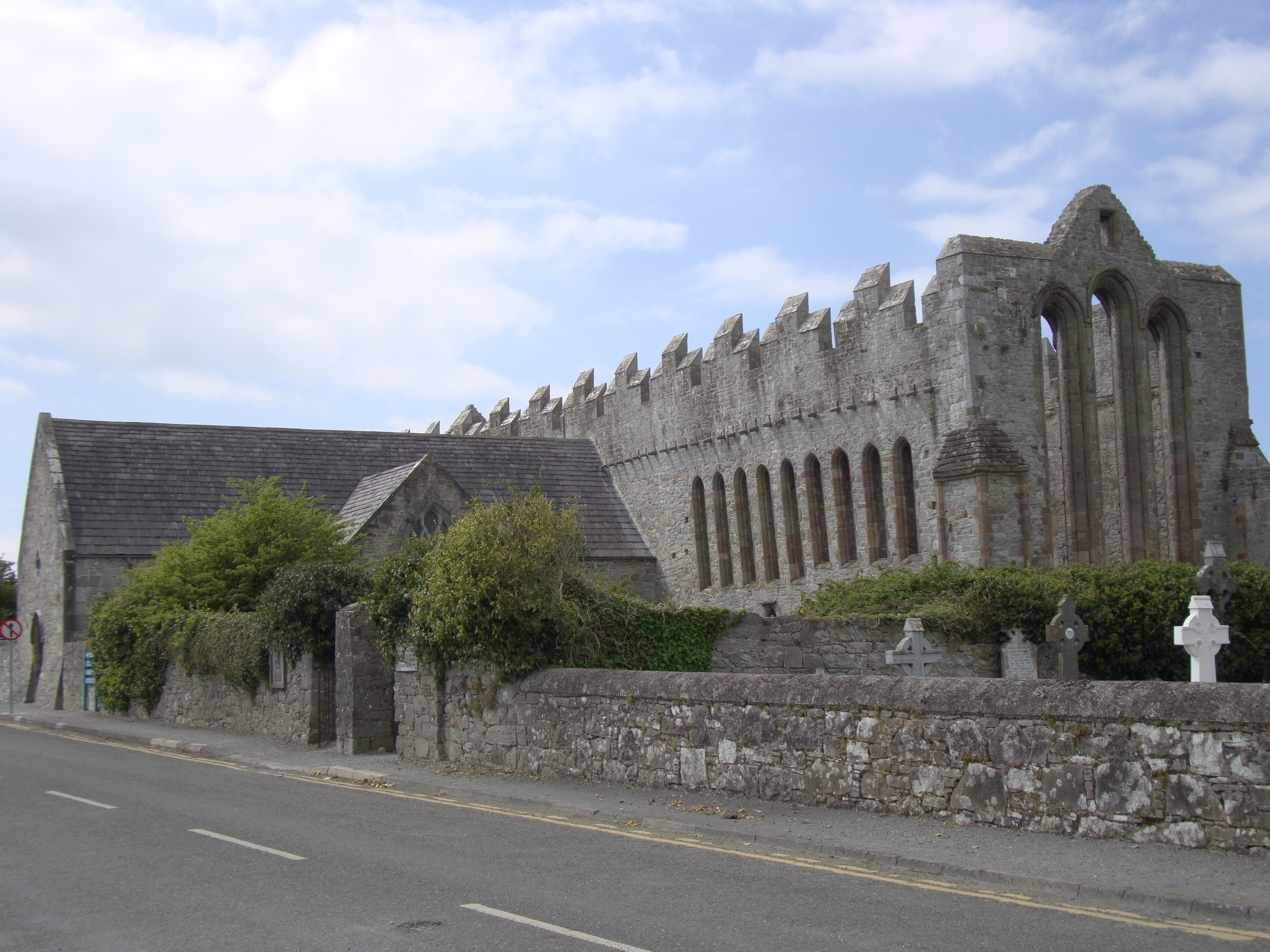
Ardfert cathedral ruins

- 1603–1603 Richard Southwell
- 1603 Robert Chaffe
- 1619/20–1628 William Steere (afterwards Bishop of Ardfert and Aghadoe 1628)
- 1630 Charles Baden
- 1635 Thomas Gray
- 1661 Daniel Witter (afterwards Dean of Down and later Bishop of Killaloe 1669)
- 1664 Thomas Bladen
- 1686 John Richards
- 1727/8 James Bland
- 1728 William Smyth (Archdeacon of Meath, 1730)
- 1732–1747 Charles Meredyth, son of Thomas Meredyth of Newtown, co. Meath
- 1747–1766 Sir Philip Hoby, 5th Baronet
- 1766–1772 Edward Bayly (afterwards Archdeacon of Dublin, 1772)
- 1785–1802 Thomas Graves (afterwards Dean of Connor, 1802)
- 1802–1842 Gilbert Holmes
- 1847–1861 Arthur Irwin
- 1861–1879 John Godfrey Day (died 1878)
- 1879–1894 Thomas Moriarty
- 1895–1906 Abraham Isaac
- 1906–1911 James MacEwan
- 1911–1917 Robert Beatty
- 1918–1924 George Power
- 1924–1946 Robert Rowan
- 1947–1959 Charles Haines
- 1959–1966 Robert Thompson
- 1966–1985 Charles Gray-Stack

== Deans of Limerick and Ardfert ==
- 1987–2011 Maurice Sirr
- 2012–2017 Sandra Pragnell
- 2017–current Niall Sloane
