= Charles Haines (priest) =

Irish priest

Charles Loftus Haines was Dean of Ardfert from 1947 until 1959.

Haines was educated at Trinity College, Dublin and ordained in 1913. He began his ecclesiastical career with curacies at Guilcagh, West Wycombe and Dromod. During World War I he was a chaplain to the British Armed Forces. He was Rector of Kilcrohane from 1924 until 1959.

He died on 6 January 1950.
