= Joseph Talbot (priest) =

Irish dean

Joseph Talbot was Dean of Cashel from 1924 to 1946.

He was educated Trinity College, Dublin and ordained in 1899. His first post was as a Curate at Cahir after which he was a Chaplain to the Forces at Portsmouth. After further curacies at Waterford and Lismore he was the incumbent at Clonbeg then Shanrahan. His son Maurice John Talbot became Dean of Limerick.

Church of Ireland titles
Preceded by William Chadwick Bourchier	Dean of Cashel; 1924–1946	Succeeded by Robert Wyse Jackson
