= John Marckant =

English clergyman and author

John Marckant or Markant (died 12 September 1585) was an English clergyman and author. He was the vicar of Great Clacton in Essex from 1559 until his death. But his fame rests on the claim that he was the author of several poems in The Whole Book of Psalms (‘Sternhold and Hopkins’).

== Family ==
John Marckant was the son of John Markaunt of Dunham Hall near Bury St Edmunds, Suffolk, gent., and his wife Elizabeth Colt, daughter of a certain Colt of Colts Hall in Cavendish, Suffolk. There is no obvious place for the poet’s mother in the Colt pedigree, but if she was a daughter of this house, then John Marckant was a relative of sir Thomas More, who married Jane Colt, daughter of John Colt (d. 1521) of Colts Hall (and other places). John Marckant’s sister Mary also married a Colt of Cavendish. John Marckant junior married Margaret Tedder, daughter of Griffin Tedder or Tather of Melverley, Shropshire. She was still living in 1595.

In his will, made on 14 September 1583, John Marckant [Markant] described himself as of the parish of St Giles in Colchester, Essex. But as late as 20 October 1582, he was still living at Stoke-by-Nayland, Essex. His eldest son was Edmund Marckant (b. 7 October 1568), later of Colchester; his younger sons John Markaunt, later also of Colchester, and William, later of Thorington Hall in Essex, were both still under 21. He mentions his daughter Elizabeth, also still under 21 years of age and not yet married. Other daughters are also mentioned but not named’, and they are presumably the Margaret who is mentioned in the pedigree as the wife of John Gage of London, and the Sara and ‘Syvys’, named in the post mortem of 1595. He named his wife as executor, and his ‘cousin’, Joseph Scott, as his overseer. The will mentions property in Mildenhall and Bury St Edmunds, Suffolk; Colchester, Kirby-le-Soken and Thorpe-le-Soken, Essex; and in London.

According to a post mortem inquisition held at the Guildhall, London, on 21 February 1595, John Marckant [Markaunt] died on 12 September 1585. The date of the proving of his will is given as ‘anno millesimo quingensimo quinto’, viz. 12 November 15-5, evidently an error for 1585.

== The Clergyman ==
In 1548, John Marckant [Markaunt] was one of the 11 vicars named in an account of the assets of the College of St Stephen, Westminster, as part of the college’s dissolution. As John Merkaunt, he was listed as a late chantry priest of the college in 1554. In the interval, on 6 November 1549, ‘John Marcante’ was admitted a petty canon at Westminster Cathedral. He was replaced on 22 October 1551.

On 31 August 1559, John Marckant [Joh. Markant] was appointed to the vicarage of Great Clacton in Essex, in the diocese of London. His patron was John Darcy (d. 1581), 2. baron Darcy of Chiche, Essex. Chiche is now St Osyth, about 5 miles west of Clacton. Marckant remained here till his death in 1585.

On 27 April 1563, John Marckant [Johannes Marcant] was collated to the perpetual vicarage of Wrotham, Kent, in the diocese of Rochester. His patron was Matthew Parker (1504–1575), archbishop of Canterbury. Wrotham was a peculiar of the archbishop, who could appoint whomever he pleased. This may indicate that Parker had a personal interest in Marckant. But Marckant did not stay long (if at all) at Wrotham, for Parker appointed William Cancellor on 28 June 1563. Cancellar was replaced — unwillingly — on 5 August 1568 by Henry Beecher.

On 14 May 1563, John Marckant [Markaunt] was presented by the crown to the vicarage of Shopland, Essex, in the diocese of London. He was collated to the living on 26 May. Marckant resigned the living on 26 September 1569.

In 1566, Markant was appointed to the vicarage of Stoke by Nayland in Suffolk. His patron was Robert Bell. He kept the living till 1583.

== The Poet ==
Marckant is supposed to have been the author of several items in The Whole Book of Psalms, and at least four ballads, only two of which still survive.

=== The Purgation of Lord Wentworth (1559) ===
On 28 April 1559, Owen Rogers printed a ballad by John Marckant [Markant] called The Purgation of the Right Honourable Lord Wentworth Concerning the Crime Laid to his Charge. The poem takes the form of a first-person complaint, in which an unidentified speaker defends himself against those who have accused him of some wicked act. But it is easy to supply the missing detail. The speaker is Thomas Wentworth (1525—1584), 2. baron Wentworth, and the crime of which he was accused was treacherously surrendering Calais to the French on 7 January 1558.

The full-title of the poem ends with the phrase : ‘Made 10 January anno 1558’. If this phrase refers to the ‘making’ of the purgation, i.e., ‘the act of clearing oneself from an accusation or suspicion of crime or guilt’, then the poem may refer to some statement made by Wentworth a day or two after his capture by the French. If the year 1558 is to be interpreted in terms of the legal calendar, then it could refer to some such statement made a year later.

=== The Whole Books of Psalms'' (1562) ===
Several of the items in The Whole Books of Psalms have the initial ‘M’ printed next to them, as do some of the hymns which appear in it. John Bale, in his Summarium (1548), a catalogue of British authors, notes that John Mardley wrote translation of 24 psalms and some hymns; and Mardley was supposed for a long time to have been the poet represented by the letter ‘M’. Then, in 1863, after a visit to the library of the British Museum, now the British Library, N. Livingston reported in the journal Notes and Queries that he had seen a copy of the 1565 edition of The Whole Book of Psalms in which the name ‘Marckant’ was ‘attached’ to the hymn ‘of Lamentation’, viz. ‘The Lamentation of a Sinner’. In a copy of the 1606 edition, the name was ‘changed’ to Market. The editor of the journal, W. J. Thoms, added a note saying that he had checked Livingston’s statements and found them to be true. However, neither Livingston nor Thoms say whether the name so ‘attached’ and ‘changed’ was printed or written as a marginal comment by some reader. Nor does the name Marckant appear in the British Library copy of the 1565 edition as Livingstone claimed, which was used to make the facsimile by Early English Books Online.

=== With Speed Return to God (1564/65) ===
In late 1564, or very early 1565, William Pickering paid for his licence to print ‘A New Year’s Gift, entitled : With Speed Return to God’ by John Marckant [Markant]. The work is lost, but it is no doubt a ballad or short pamphlet.

=== Of Dice, Wine, and Women (1565 & 1571) ===
Sometime shortly after 22 July 1565, William Griffith paid for a licence to print a ballad called A Notable Instruction for All Men to Beware the Abuses of Dice, Wine, and Women. No author was mentioned. Presumably Griffiths printed it that, and in 1571, he printed it again, with author named, apparently, as John Marckant. A single copy survives at St John’s College, Oxford. It is not available through Early English Books Online nor through the English Broadside Ballad Archive. Some lines are quoted by Cooper’s article for the Oxford Dictionary of National Biography.

=== ‘Verses to Diverse Good Purposes’ (1580) ===
On 2 or 3 November 1580, Thomas Purfoot paid for his licence to print ‘verses to diverse good purposes’ by John Marckant [Merquaunt]. Whether this is one work or several is not clear. Whatever it was, it is now lost.

== Notes ==
Attribution

This article incorporates text from a publication now in the public domain: Lee, Sidney, ed. (1893). "Marckant, John". Dictionary of National Biography. Vol. 36. London: Smith, Elder & Co.
