= William Bourchier (priest) =

William Chadwick Bourchier (28 February 1852 – 24 June 1924) was Dean of Cashel from 1916 to 1924.

He was educated at Portora Royal School and Trinity College, Dublin and ordained in 1879. His first post was as a Curate of Wellingborough after which he was Domestic Chaplain to the Marquess Camden at Bayham Abbey. In 1883 he took a second curacy in Dover. He was a Chaplain in the Royal Navy and its dockyards from 1885 until his appointment as Dean. He is buried in Knockainy churchyard.

Church of Ireland titles
Preceded by Robert Jones Sylvester Devenish	Dean of Cashel; 1916–1924	Succeeded by Joseph Talbot
