= Aylmer Hackett =

Thomas Aylmer Pearson Hackett was Dean of Limerick from 1913 to 1928.

He was born on 5 December 1854 and educated at Trinity College, Dublin. After curacies at Coleraine and Newcastle he was Rector of Kilmallock from 1881 to 1910. He was Archdeacon of Limerick from then until his elevation to the Deanery.

He died on 4 December 1928.
