= George Synge =

Bishop of Cloyne

George Synge (1594–1652) was Bishop of Cloyne from 1638 until his death in 1652.

== Life ==
He was the son of Richard Synge and Alice Rowley, daughter of Richard Rowley. A native of Bridgnorth, he was educated at Balliol College, Oxford. He came to Ireland as Chaplain to Christopher Hampton, Archbishop of Armagh and Vicar general of Armagh. Hampton thought very highly of him and recommended him for preferment, despite Synge's incurring the enmity of the formidable William Laud, with whom he clashed on the issue of private confession. He held incumbencies at Donoughmore, Loughgilly and Killary. He was appointed Treasurer of Dromore Cathedral in 1834; and Dean in 1635, a post he held until his elevation to the episcopate in 1638.

On the outbreak of the Irish Rebellion of 1641, he fled for safety to Dublin. Tragedy struck the same year when several of his family perished in a shipwreck. He was sworn a member of the Privy Council of Ireland in 1644. In 1647 he was nominated as Archbishop of Tuam, but due to the state of civil war in Ireland, he was unable to gain possession of the Archdiocese. He retired to Bridgnorth and died there.

== Family ==
He married firstly Anne Edgeworth, daughter of Francis Edgeworth of Dublin, Clerk of the Crown and Hanaper, and niece of Edward Edgeworth, Bishop of Down and Connor. He married secondly Elizabeth Stephens, and had issue by both marriages, including Margaret (died 1641), who married Michael Boyle, Archbishop of Armagh. His younger brother Edward Synge was like George a bishop, as were his son and grandson, both also named Edward.
