= English Gothic architecture =

Architectural style in Britain

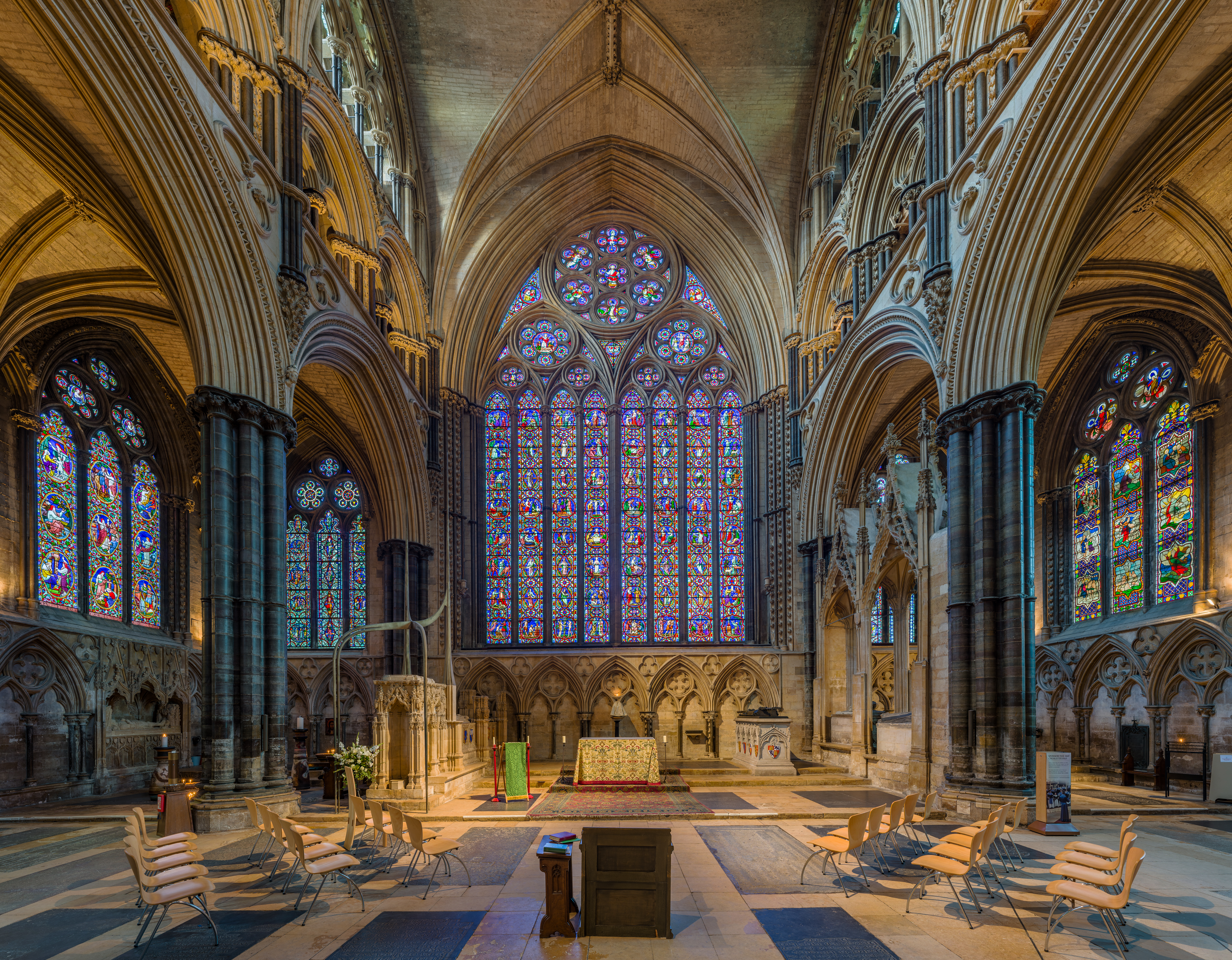
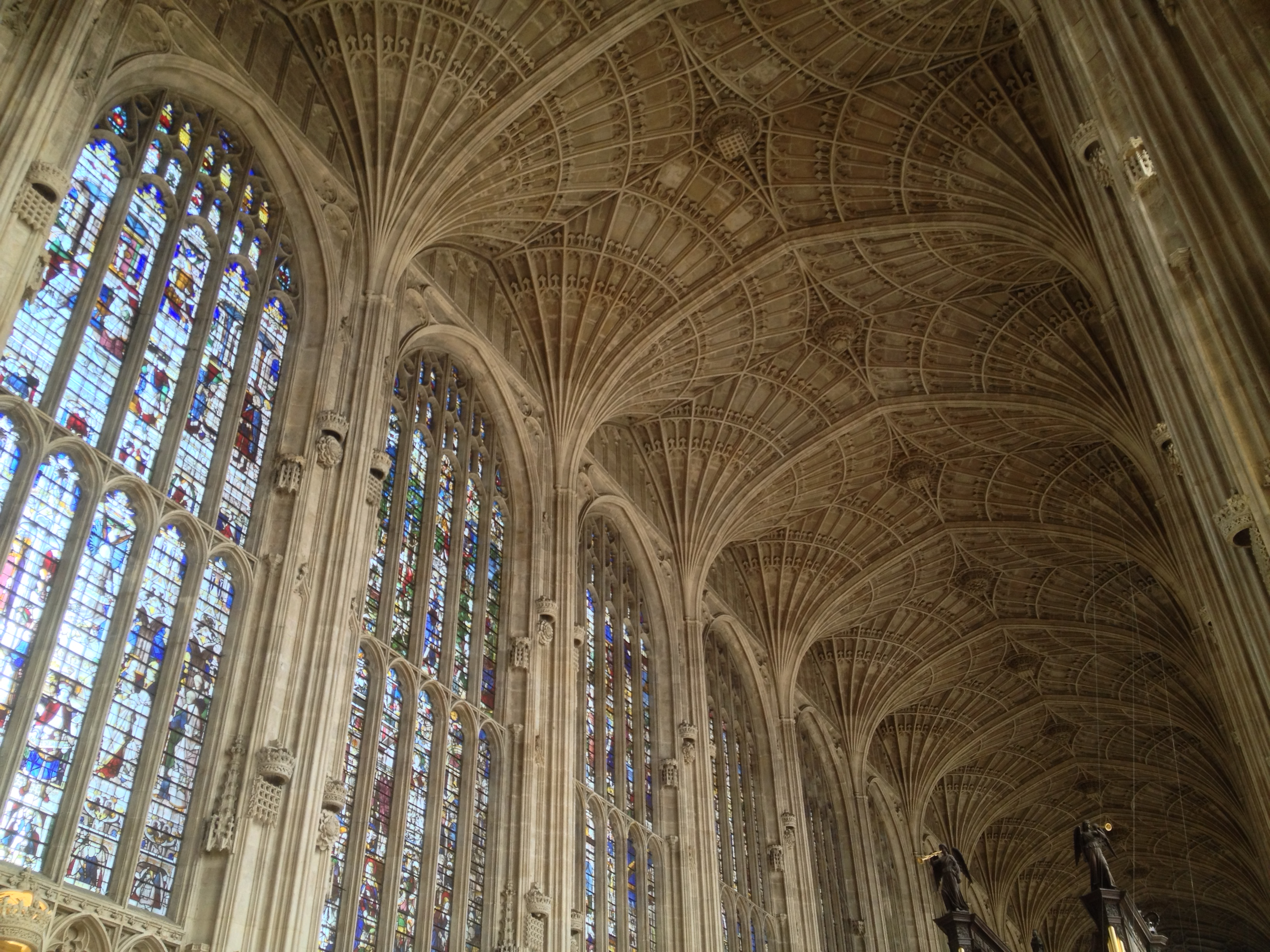
- 1. Salisbury Cathedral; 2. Lincoln Cathedral; 3. King's College Chapel
- Years active: c. 1175–1640
- Location: Kingdom of England
- Influences: Norman architecture French Gothic architecture

English Gothic is an architectural style that flourished from the late 12th until the mid-17th century. The majority of surviving Gothic buildings are cathedrals and churches. Gothic architecture's defining features are pointed arches, rib vaults, buttresses, and extensive use of stained glass. Combined, these features allowed the creation of buildings of unprecedented height and grandeur, filled with light from large stained glass windows. Important examples include Westminster Abbey, Canterbury Cathedral and Salisbury Cathedral. In some conservative contexts, such as Oxbridge colleges, the Gothic style endured in England into the 17th century, much longer than in most of Continental Europe, in the so-called "Gothic Survival".

The Gothic style was introduced from France, where the various elements had first been used together within a single building at the choir of the Abbey of Saint-Denis north of Paris, completed in 1144. Other features were imported from the Ile-de-France, where the first French Gothic cathedral, Sens Cathedral, had been built (1135–64). The new French style was first used in England at Canterbury Cathedral (1175–85), where the French mason William of Sens rebuilt the choir after a fire in 1174. However, many features of Gothic architecture also evolved naturally from Romanesque architecture (often known in England as Norman architecture). For instance, the earliest large rib vault was over the Norman Durham Cathedral. The first cathedral in England to be both planned and built entirely in the Gothic style was Wells Cathedral, begun in 1175. Besides cathedrals, monasteries, and parish churches, the style was used for many secular buildings, including university buildings, castles, palaces, great houses, almshouses and guildhalls.

== Periods and styles ==
The English Gothic style is generally divided into three periods:

- Early English or First Pointed (late 12th–late 13th centuries)
- Decorated Gothic or Second Pointed (mid-13th–late 14th centuries)
- Perpendicular Gothic or Third Pointed (mid-14th–17th centuries)

The architect and art historian Thomas Rickman's Attempt to Discriminate the Style of Architecture in England, first published in 1812, divided Gothic architecture in the British Isles into three stylistic periods. Rickman identified the periods of architecture as follows:

- William the Conqueror (r. 1066–87) to Henry II (r. 1154–89) as Norman
- Richard the Lionheart (r. 1189–1199) to Edward I (r. 1272–1307) as Early English
- reigns of Edward II (r. 1307–1327) and Edward III (r. 1327–1377) as Decorated
- from Richard II (r. 1377–1399) to Henry VIII (r. 1509–1547) as Perpendicular

From the late 15th century, under the House of Tudor, the prevailing Gothic style is commonly known as Tudor architecture. This style is ultimately succeeded by Elizabethan architecture and Renaissance architecture under Elizabeth I (r. 1558–1603). Rickman excluded from his scheme most new buildings after Henry VIII's reign, calling the style of "additions and rebuilding" in the later 16th and earlier 17th centuries "often much debased".

Architect and art historian Edmund Sharpe, in The Seven Periods of English Architecture (1851), identified a pre-Gothic Transitional Period (1145–1190), following the Norman period, in which pointed arches and round arches were employed together. Focusing on the windows, Sharpe dubbed Rickman's Gothic styles as follows:

- Rickman's first Gothic style as the Lancet Period (1190–1245)
- Rickman's second Gothic style divided into the Geometrical period (1245–1315) and then the Curvilinear period (1315–1360)
- Rickman's third style as the Rectilinear period (1360–1550). Unlike the Early English and Decorated styles, this third style, employed over three centuries was unique to England

== Survival and Revival ==
In the English Renaissance, the stylistic language of the ancient classical orders and the Renaissance architecture of southern Europe began to supplant Gothic architecture in Continental Europe, but the British Isles continued to favour Gothic building styles, with traditional Perpendicular Gothic building projects undertaken into the 17th century in England and both Elizabethan and Jacobean architecture incorporating Gothic features, particularly for churches.

Classical-inspired architecture predominated after the Great Fire of London The rebuilding of the City of London was so extensive that the numbers of workers employed broke the monopoly of the medieval livery company of stonemasons and the Worshipful Company of Masons and the role of master-mason was displaced by that of the early modern architect. The new St Paul's Cathedral designed by Christopher Wren and his Wren churches mostly dispensed with the Gothic idiom in favour of classical work. Outside London however, new ecclesiastical buildings and repairs to older churches were still carried out in Gothic style, particularly near the ancient university towns of Oxford and Cambridge, where the university colleges were important patrons of 17th-century Gothic construction.

By the 18th century, architects occasionally worked in Gothic style, but the living tradition of Gothic workmanship had faded and their designs rarely resembled medieval Gothic buildings. Only when the Gothic Revival movement of the late 18th and 19th centuries began, was the architectural language of medieval Gothic relearned through the scholarly efforts of early 19th-century art historians like Rickman and Matthew Bloxam, whose Principles of Gothic Ecclesiastical Architecture first appeared in 1829.

Alongside the new Gothic building work of the 19th century, many of England's existing Gothic buildings were extensively repaired, restored, remodelled, and rebuilt by architects seeking to improve the buildings according to the Romantic, high church aesthetic of the Oxford Movement and to replace many of the medieval features lost in the iconoclastic phases of the Reformation, the Dissolution of the Monasteries, and the Wars of the Three Kingdoms. In the process of this Victorian "restoration", much of the original Gothic architecture of the Middle Ages was lost or altered beyond recognition. However, medieval works left unfinished were often completed or restored to their "original" designs. According to James Stevens Curl, the revival of Gothic architecture was "arguably, the most influential artistic phenomenon ever to spring from England".

The various English Gothic styles are seen at their most fully developed in cathedrals, monasteries, and collegiate churches. With the exception of Salisbury Cathedral, English cathedrals–having building dates that typically range over 400 years–show great stylistic diversity.

== Early English Gothic (late 12th–late 13th centuries) ==
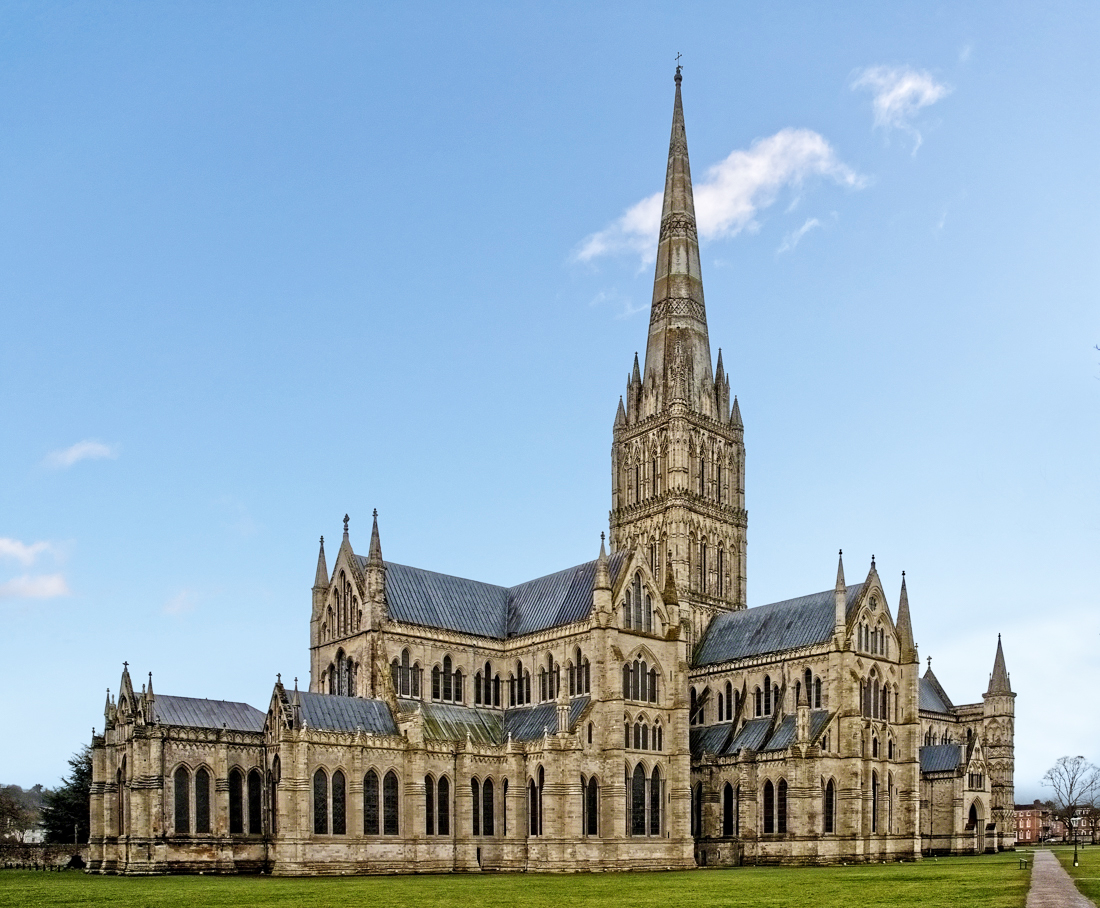
Salisbury Cathedral (1220–1258) (tower and spire later)

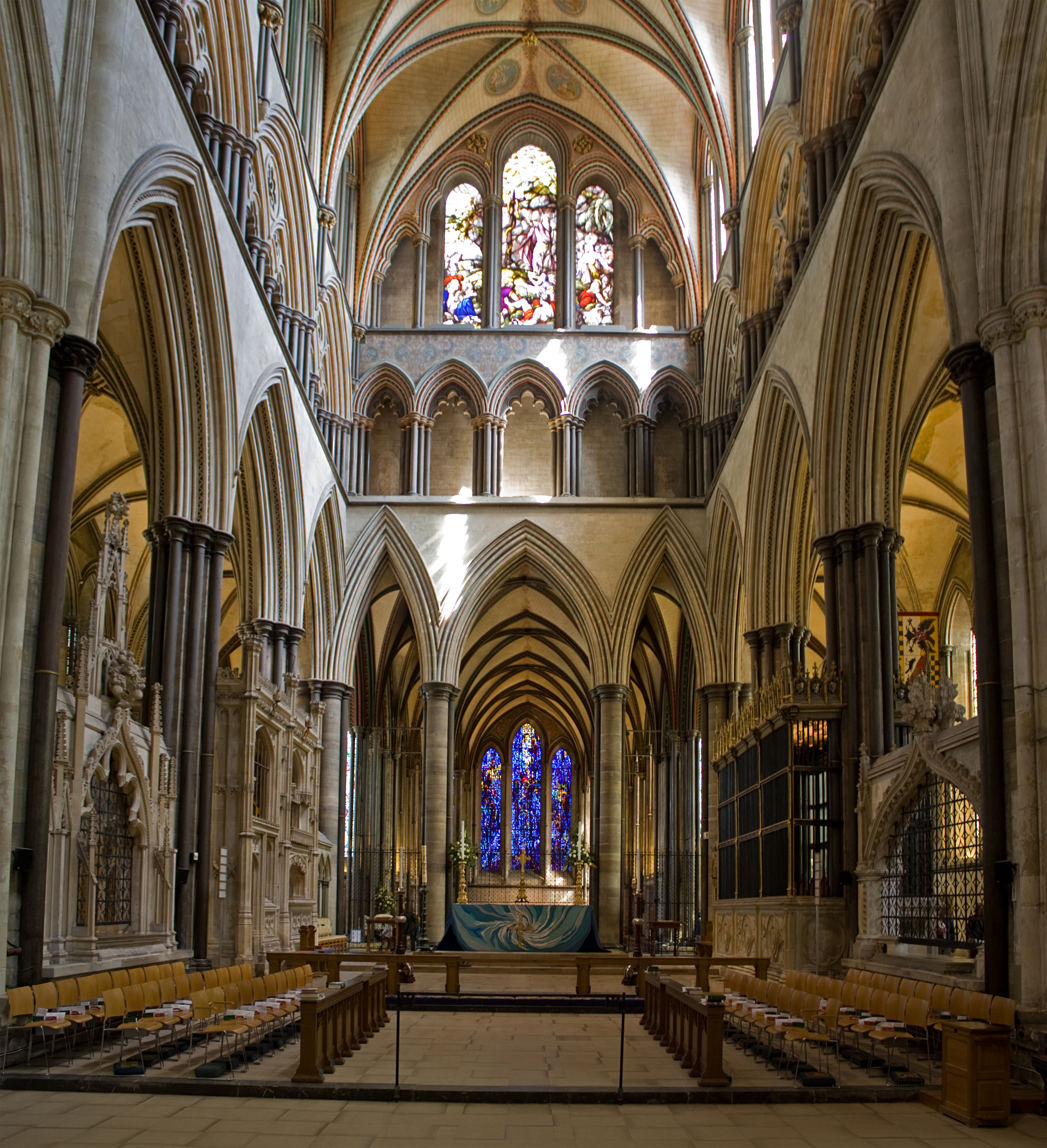
Salisbury Cathedral choir

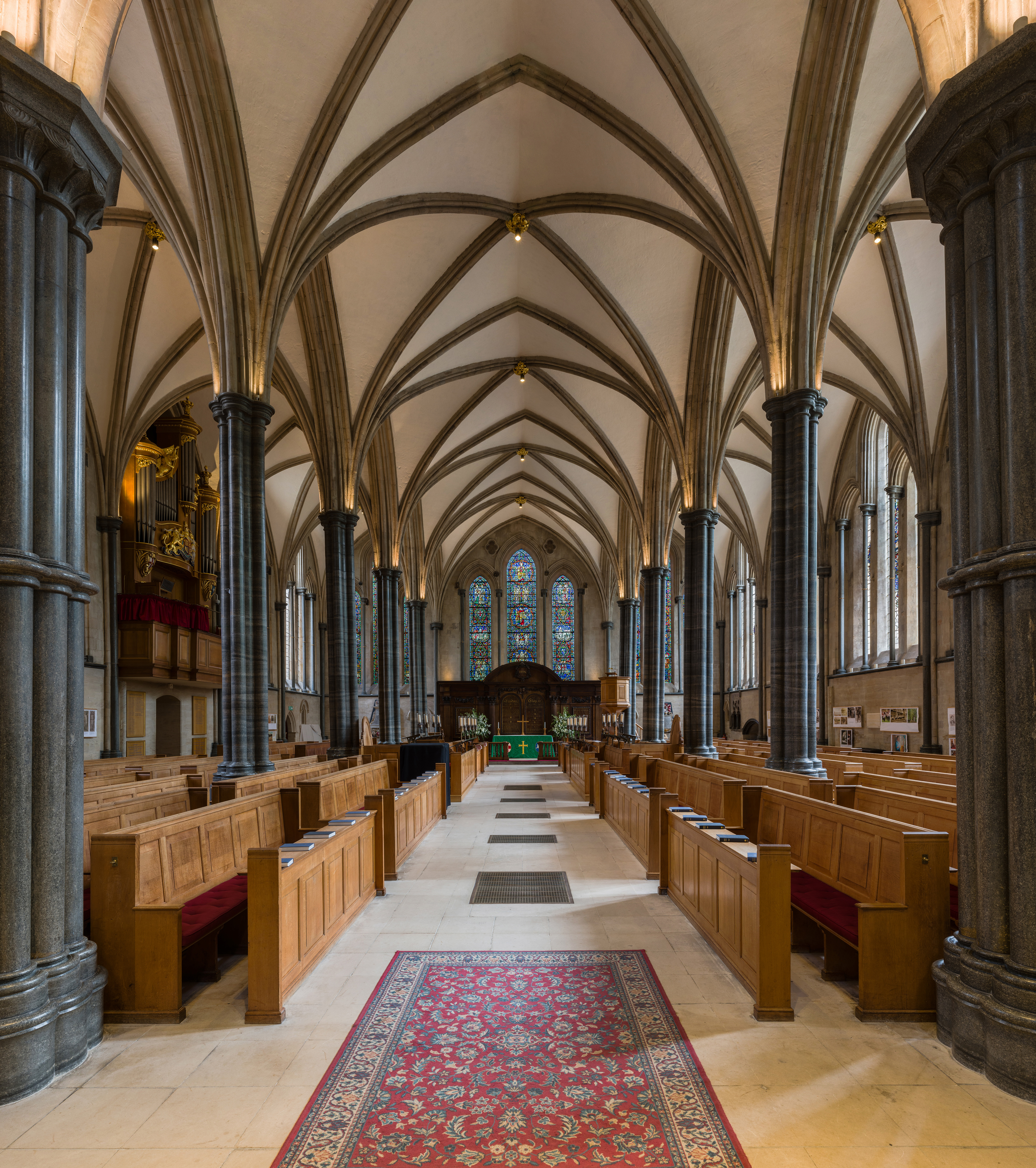
Temple Church choir

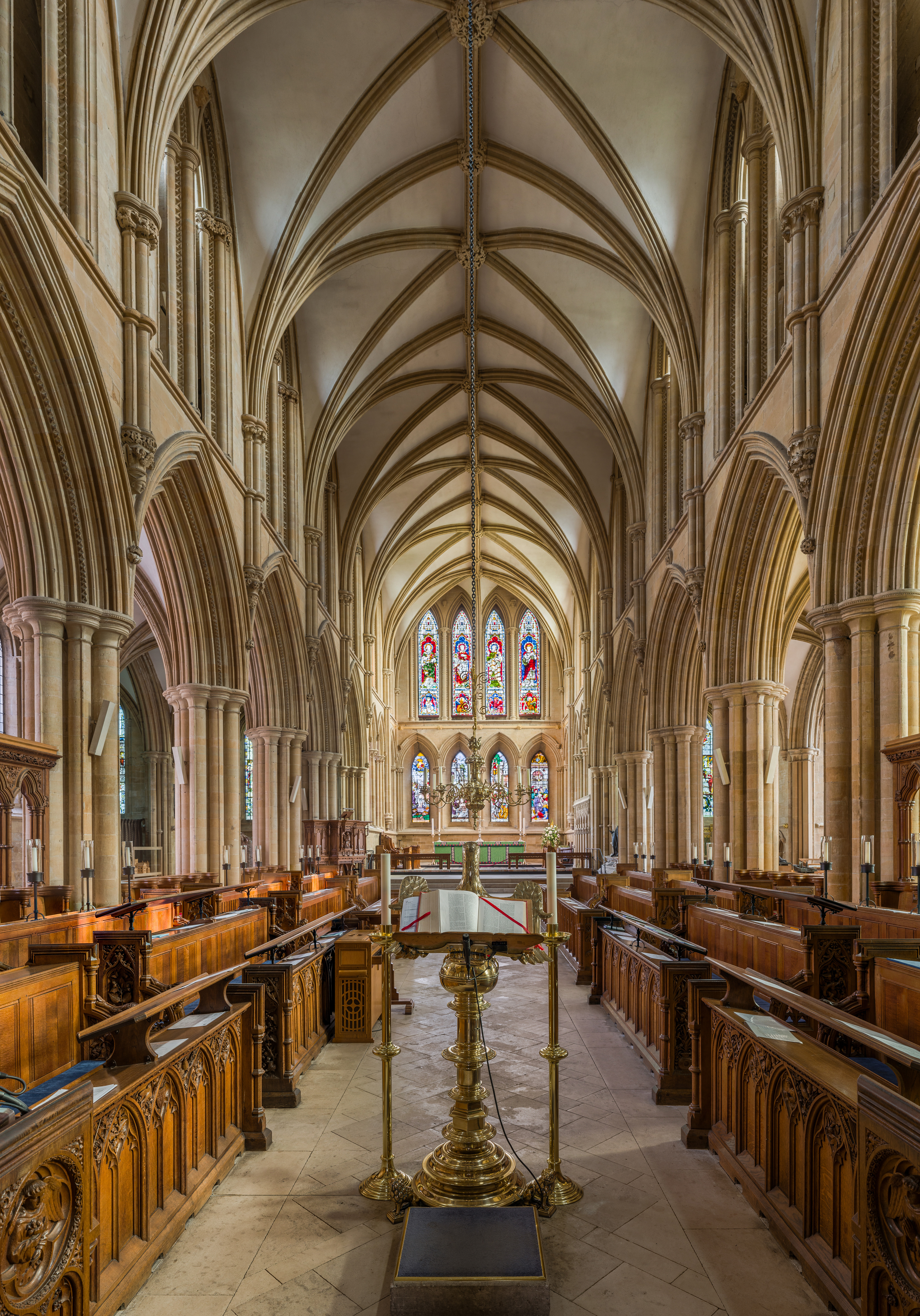
Southwell Minster choir

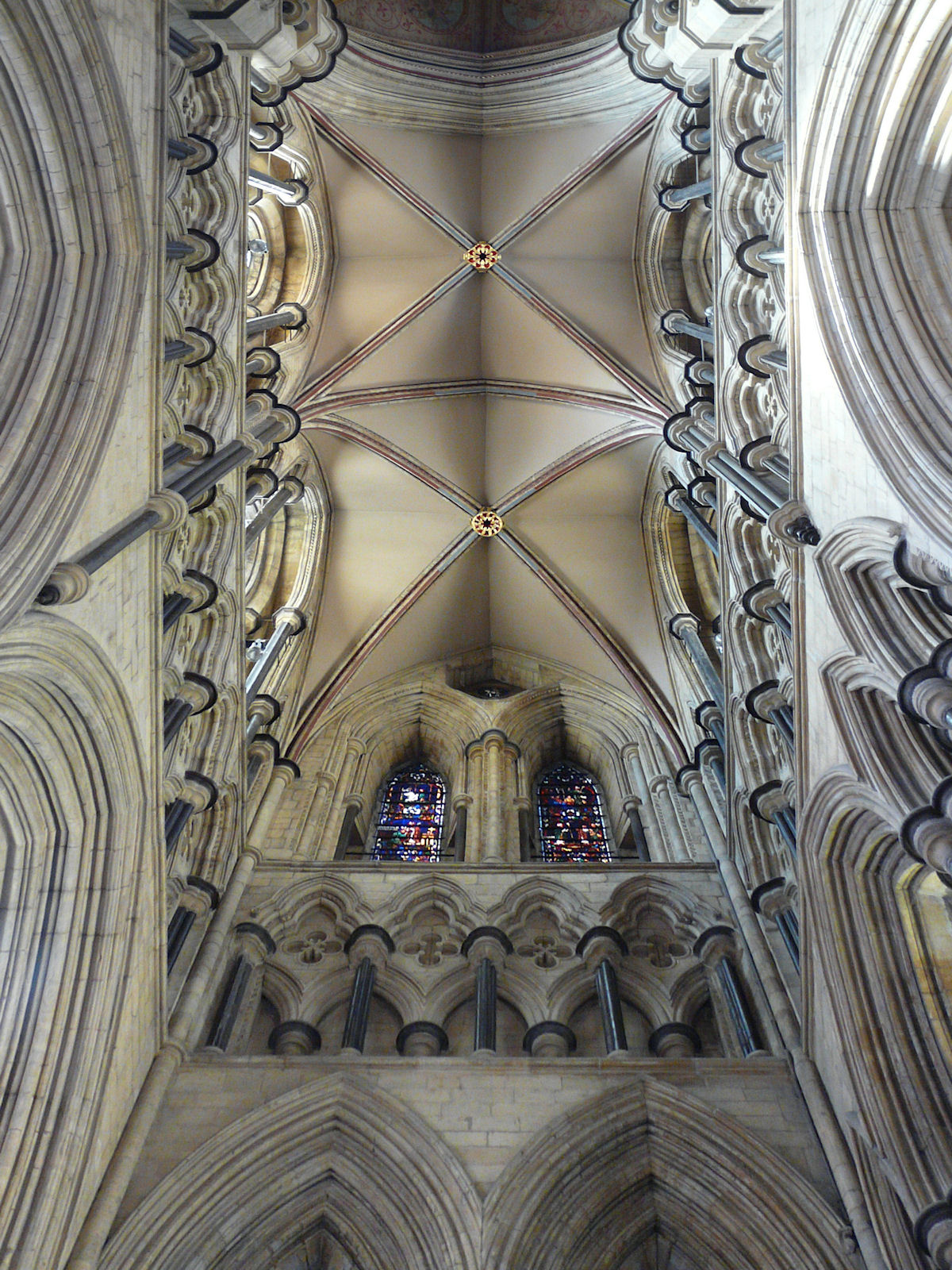
Beverley Minster transept

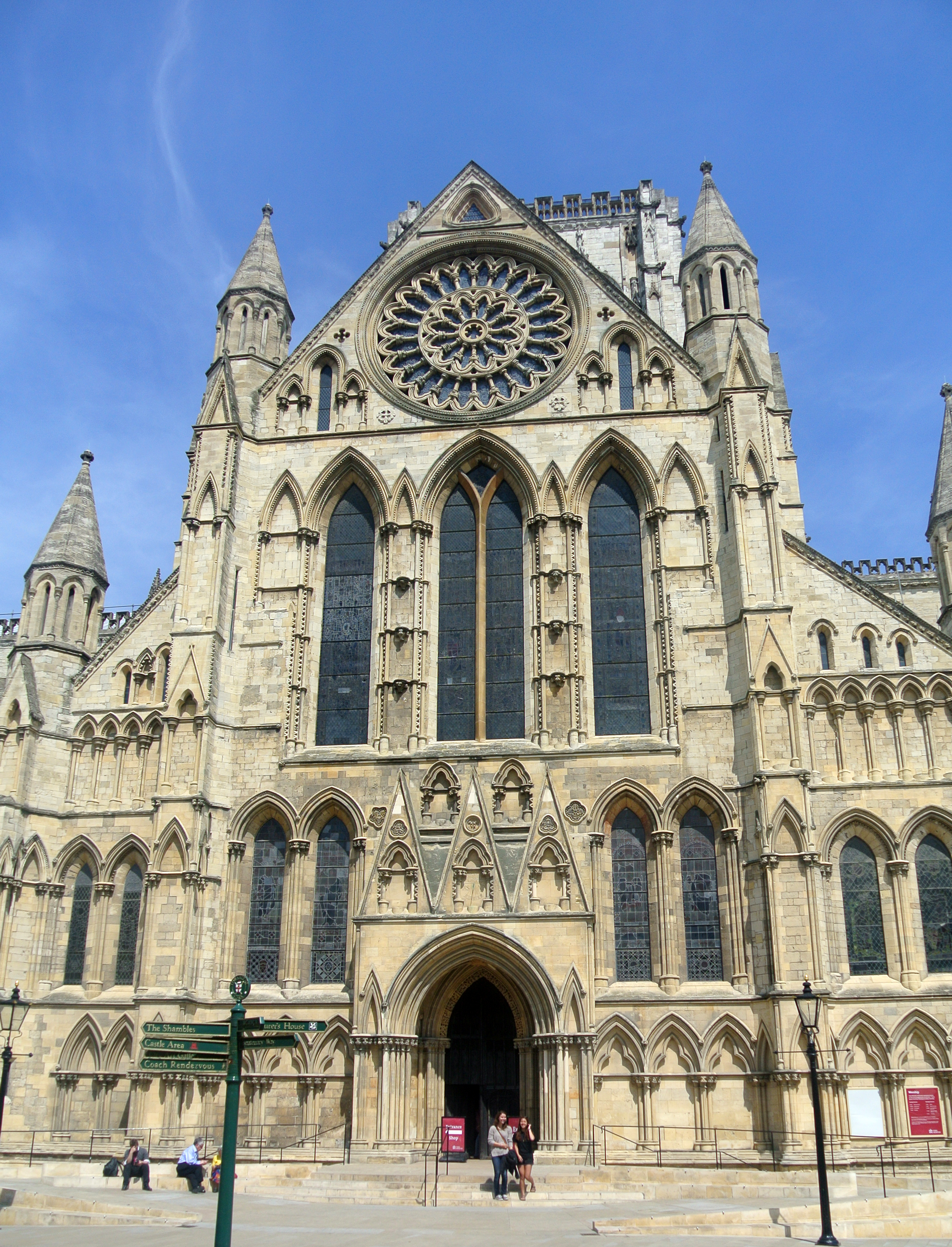
York Minster south transept

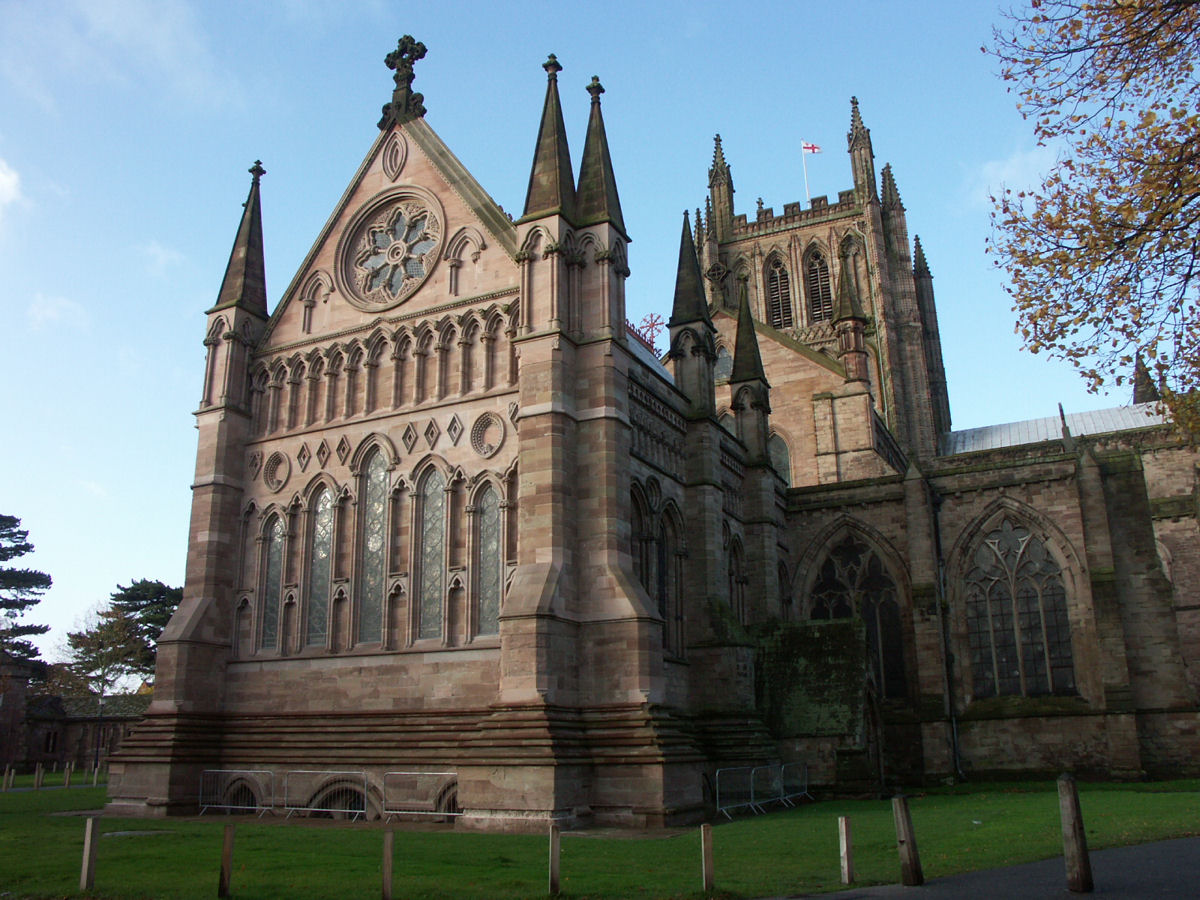
Hereford Cathedral (1079–1250) lady chapel

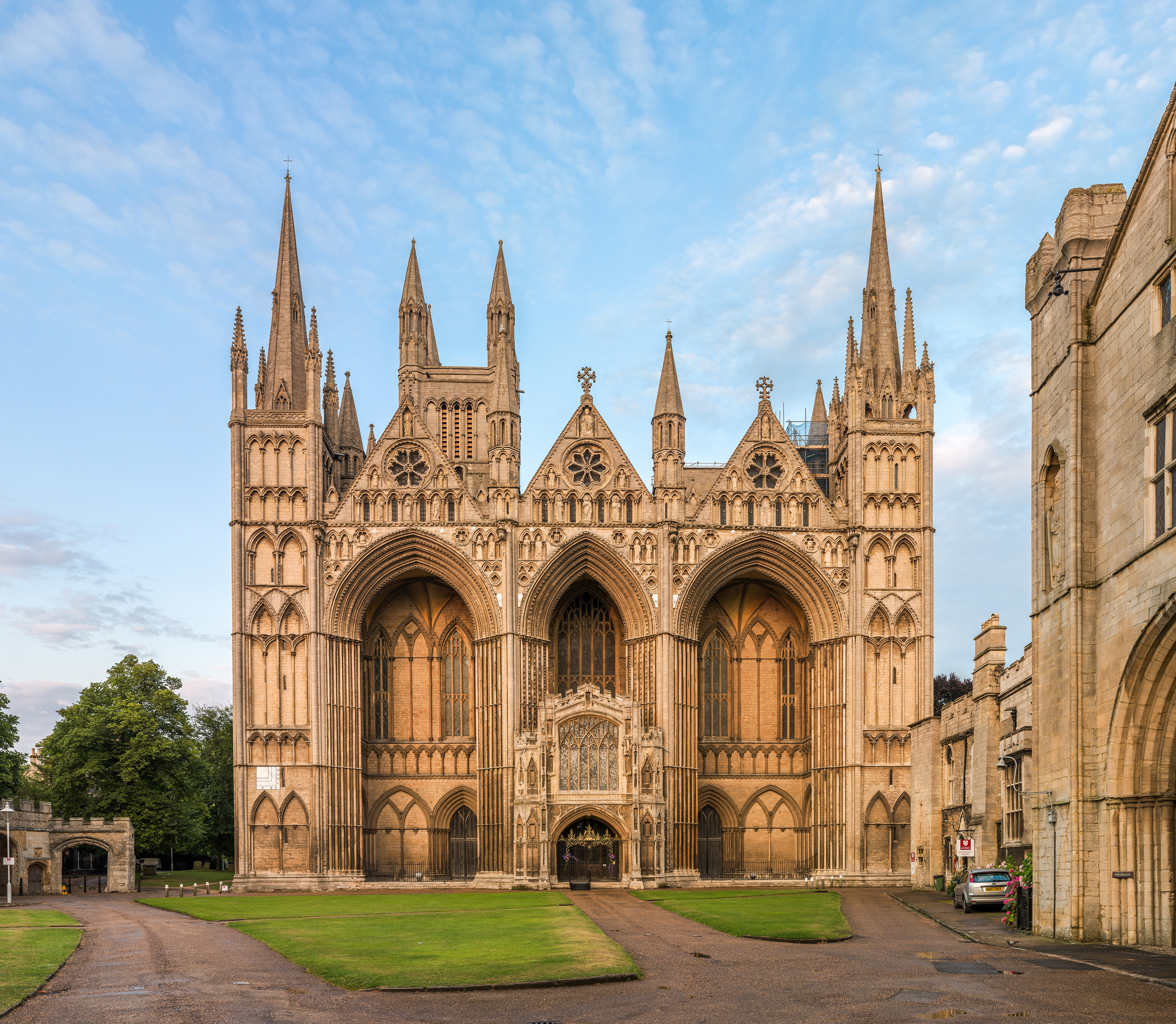
Peterborough Cathedral west front

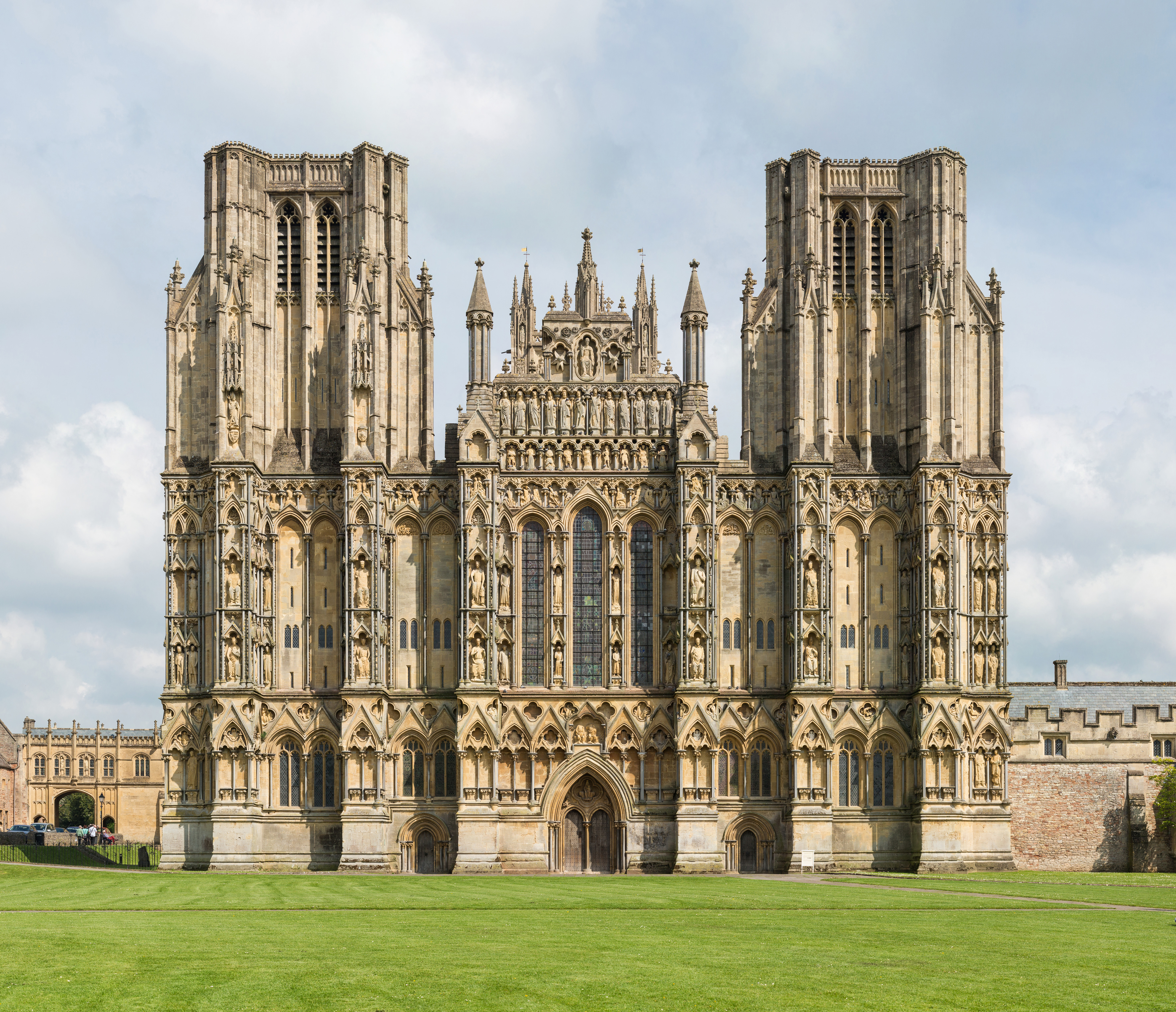
Wells Cathedral west front

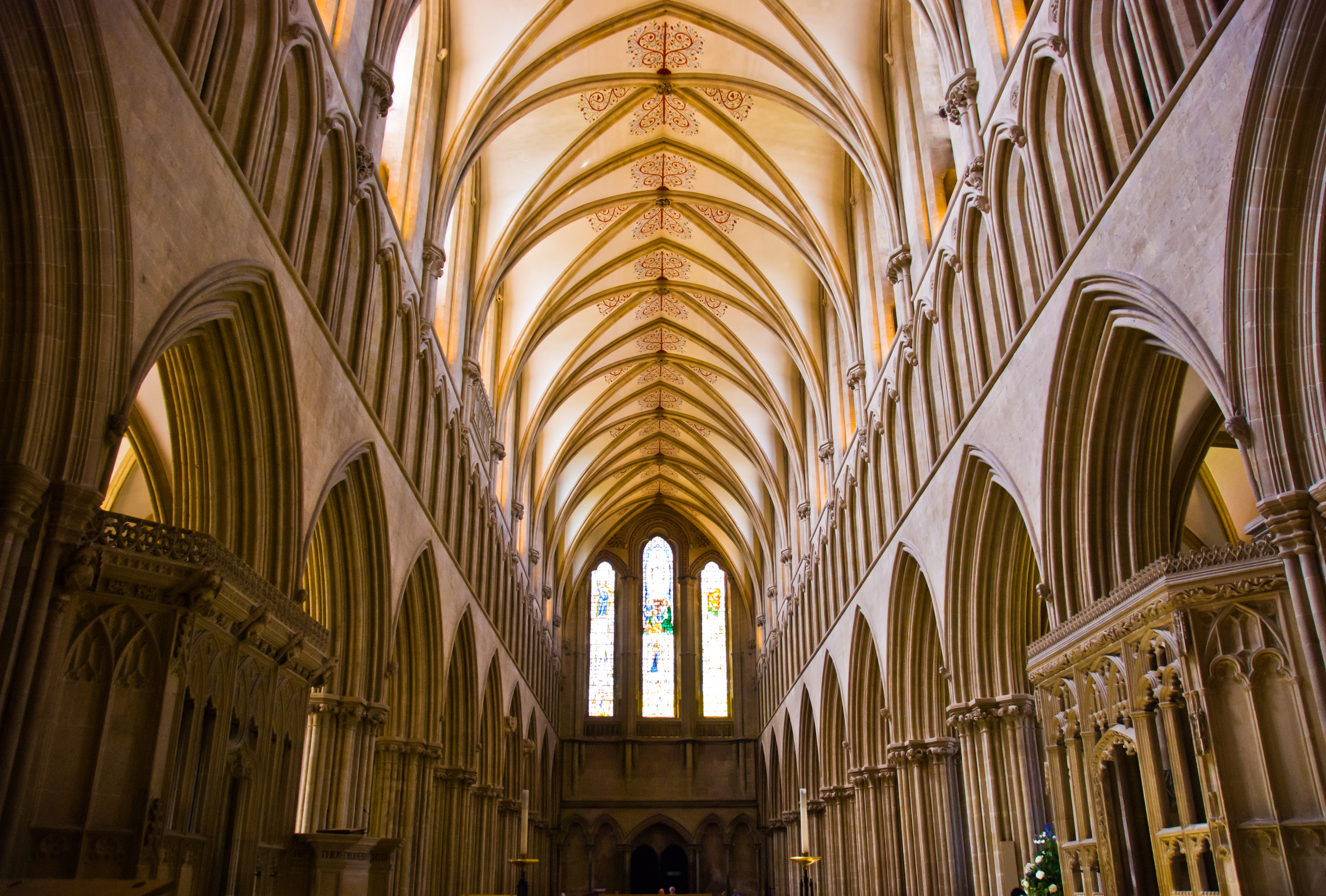
Wells Cathedral nave

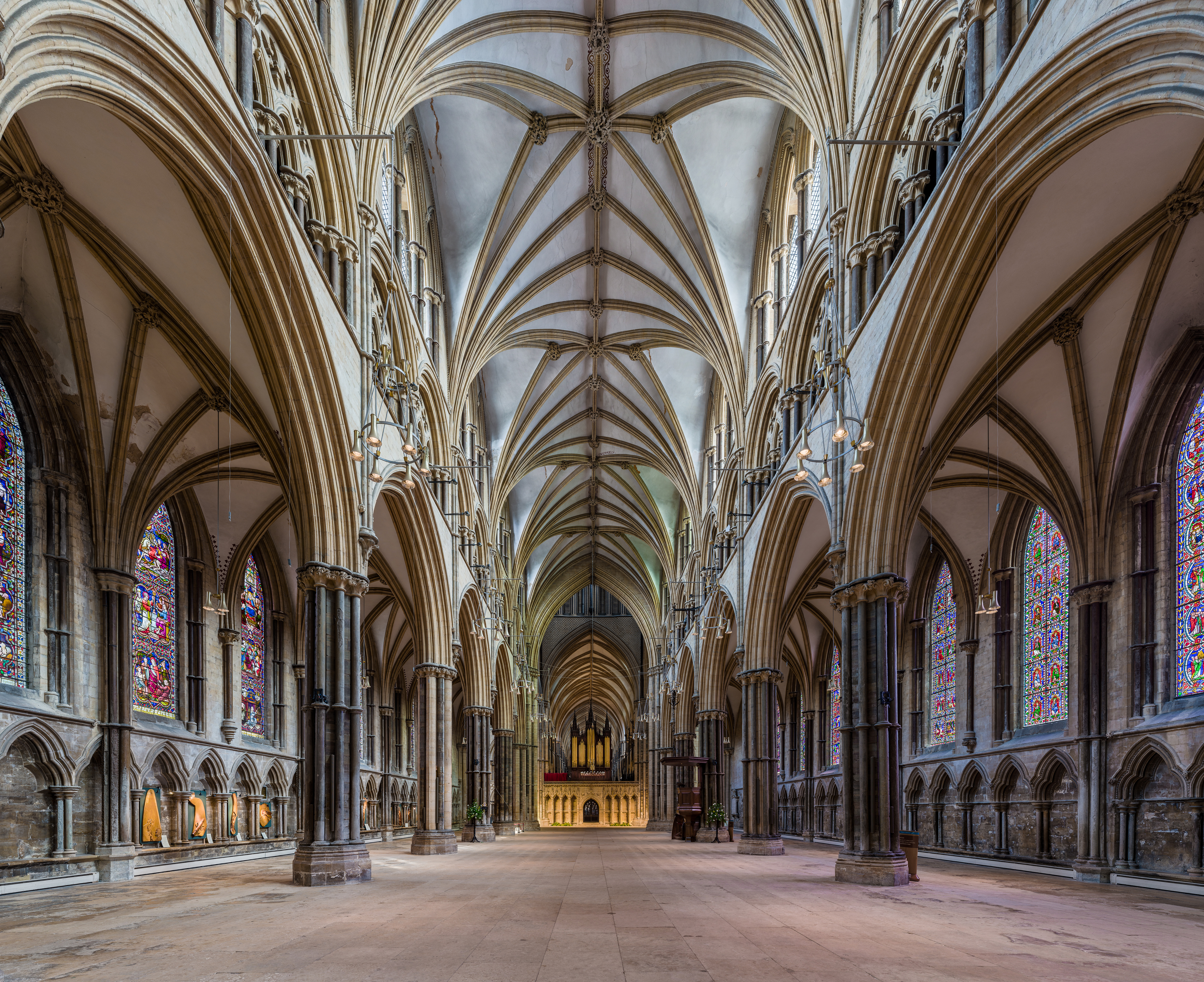
Lincoln Cathedral nave

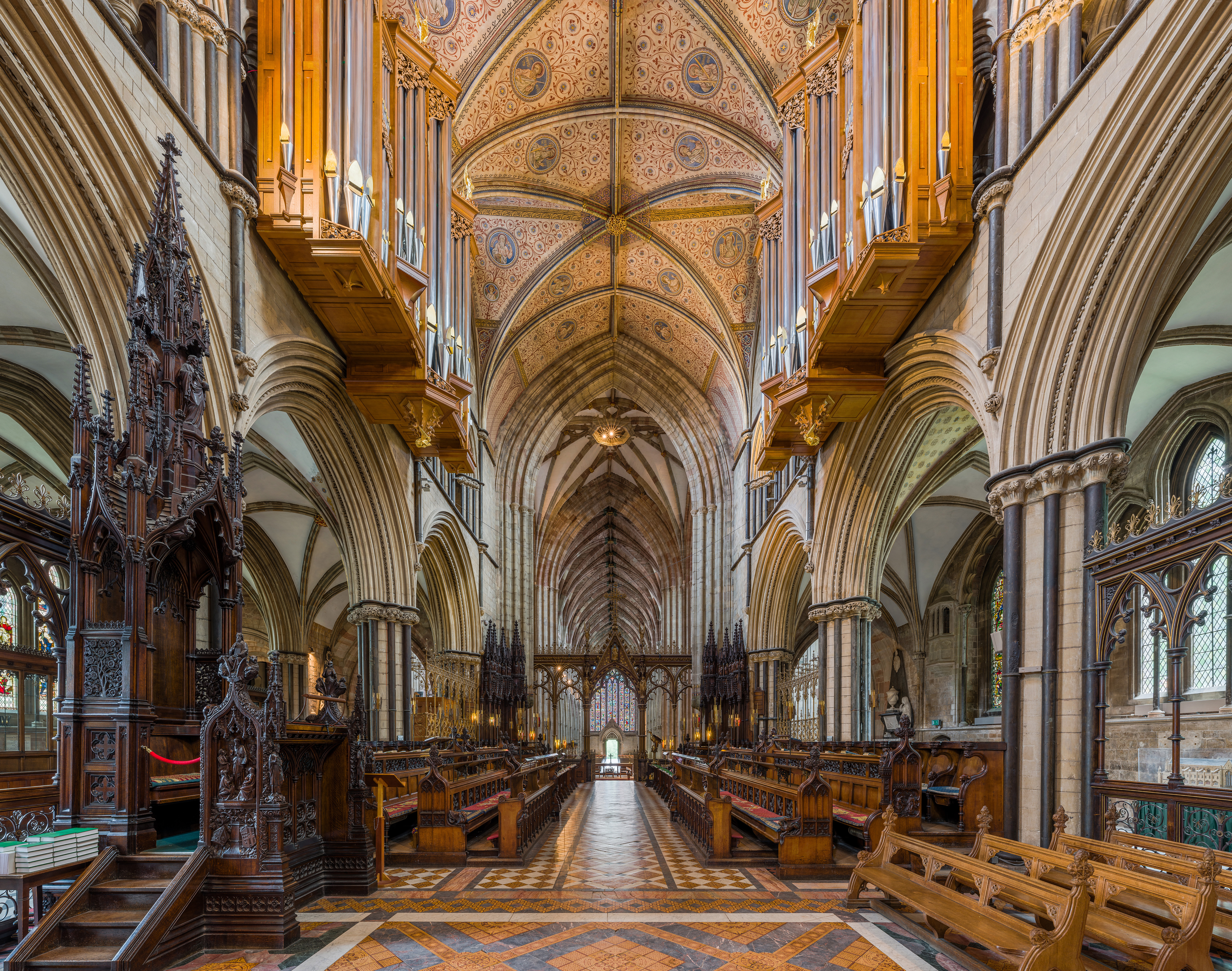
Worcester Cathedral choir

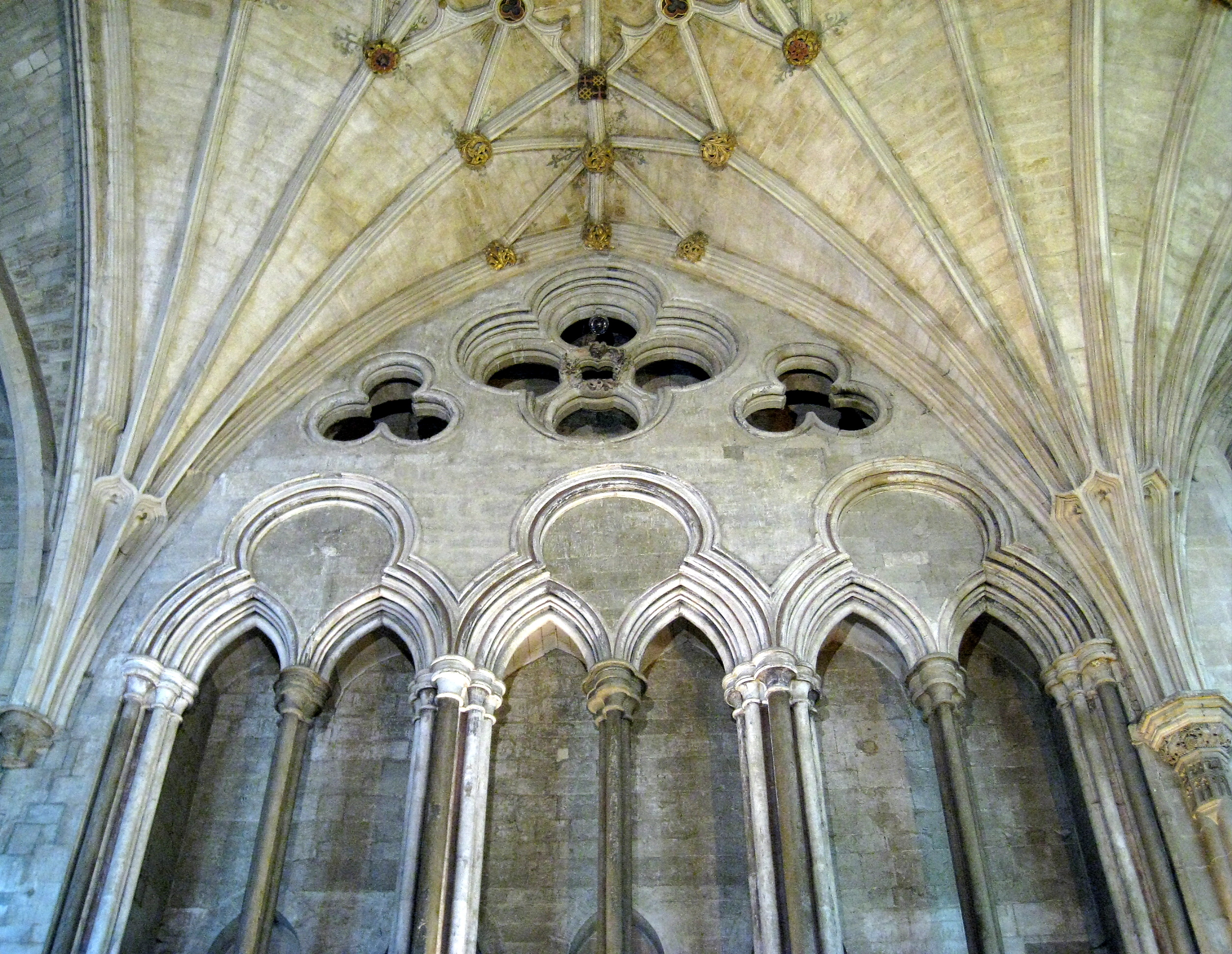
Winchester Cathedral lady chapel

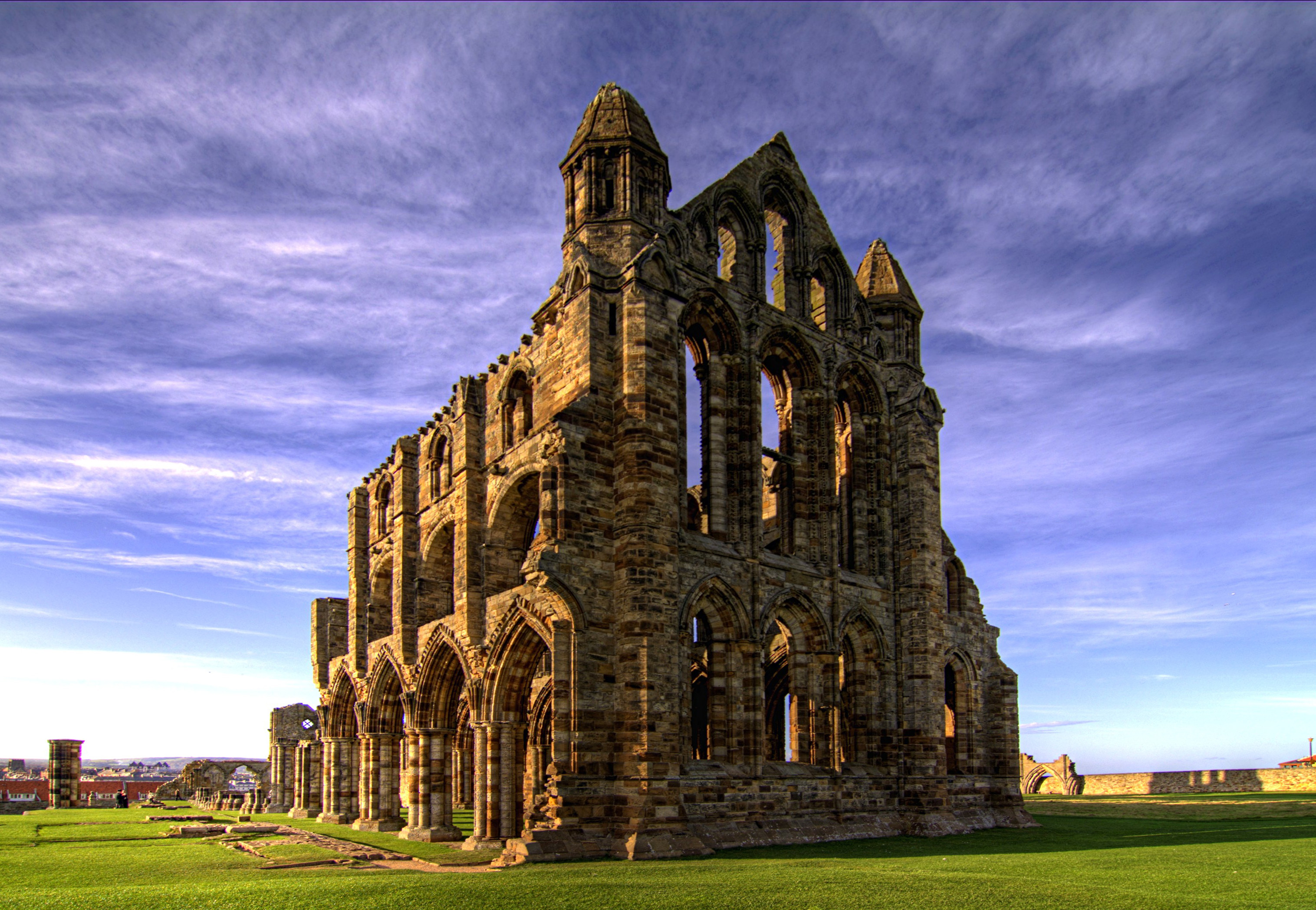
Whitby Abbey choir

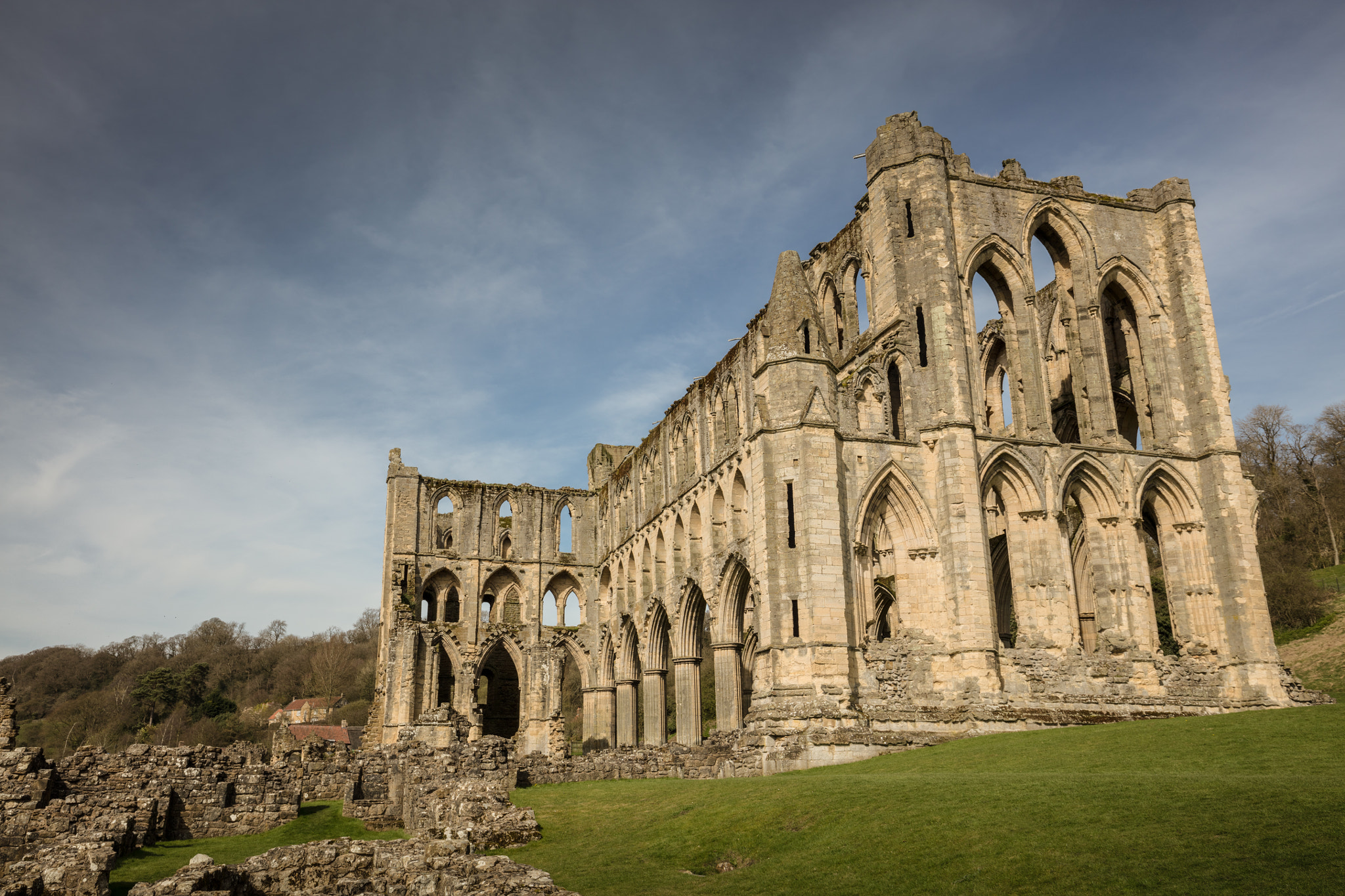
Rievaulx Abbey choir

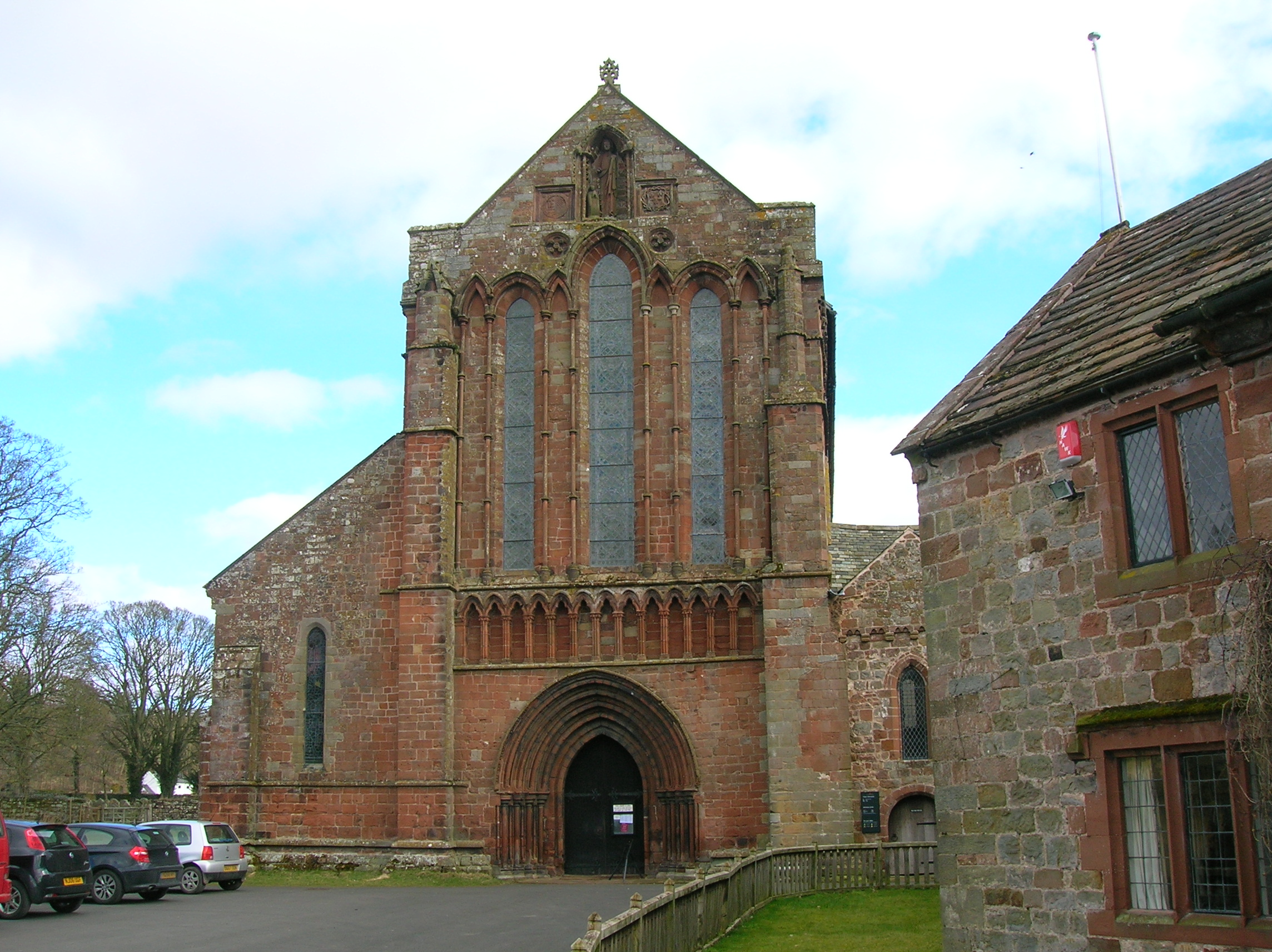
Lanercost Priory west front

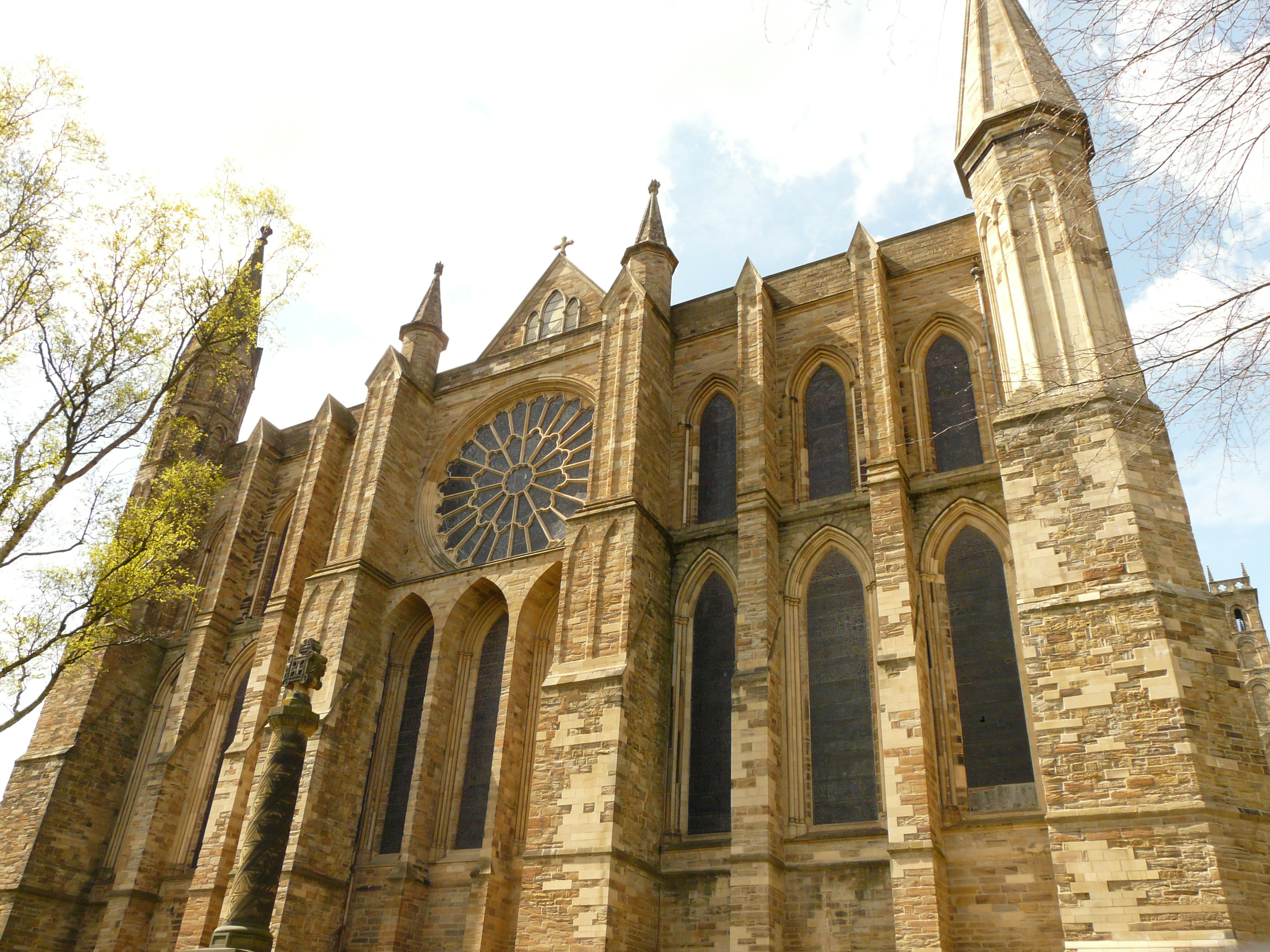
Durham Cathedral east transept

Early English Gothic predominated from the late 12th century until midway to late in the 13th century. It succeeded Norman architecture, which had introduced early great cathedrals, built of stone instead of timber, and saw the construction of remarkable abbeys throughout England. The Normans had introduced the three classical orders of architecture, and created massive walls for their buildings, with thin pilaster-like buttresses. The transition from Norman to Gothic lasted from about 1145 until 1190. In the reigns of King Stephen and Richard I, the style changed from the more massive severe Norman style to the more delicate and refined Gothic.

Early English was particularly influenced by what was called in English "The French style". The style was imported from Caen in Normandy by French Norman architects, who also imported cut stones from Normandy for their construction. It was also influenced by the architecture of the Ile-de-France, where Sens Cathedral had been constructed, the first Gothic cathedral in France. The chancel of Canterbury Cathedral, one of the first Early English structures in England, was rebuilt in the new style by a French architect, William of Sens.

The Early English style particularly featured more strongly-constructed walls with stone vaulted roofs, to resist fire. The weight of these vaults was carried downwards and outwards by arched ribs. This feature, the early rib vault, was used at Durham Cathedral, the first time it was used this way in Europe.

Another important innovation introduced in this early period was the buttress, a stone column outside the structure that reinforced the walls against the weight pressing outward and downward from the vaults. This evolved into the flying buttress, which carried the thrust from the wall of the nave over the roof of the aisle. The buttress was given further support by a heavy stone pinnacle. Buttresses were an early feature of the chapter house of Lichfield Cathedral.

Early English is typified by lancet windows, tall narrow lights topped by a pointed arch. They were grouped together side by side under a single arch and decorated with mullions in tracery patterns, such as cusps, or spear-points. Lancet windows were combined similarly pointed arches and the ribs of the vaults overhead, giving a harmonious and unified style.

=== Characteristics ===
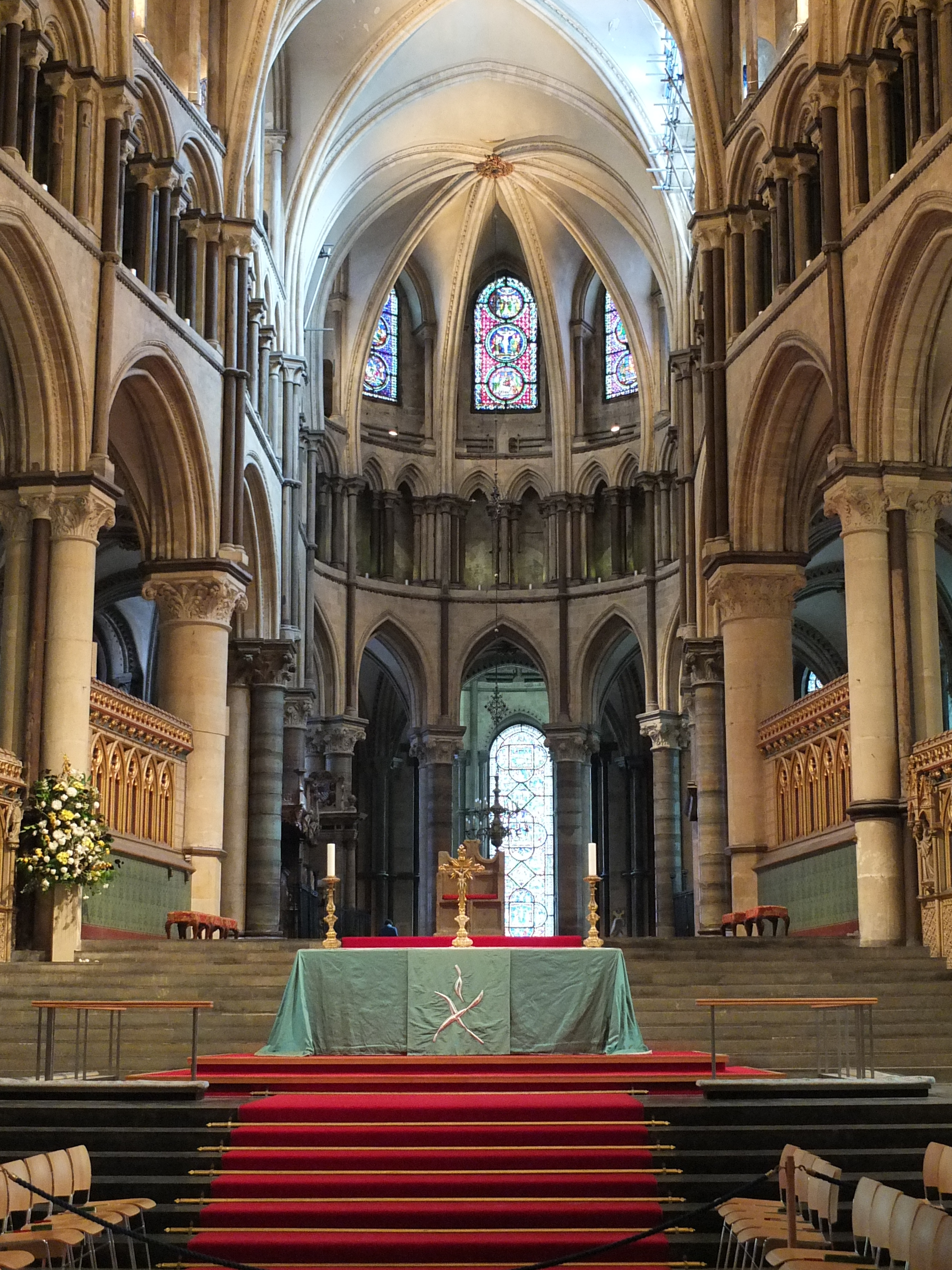
Choir of Canterbury Cathedral rebuilt by William of Sens and William the Englishman (1174–1184)

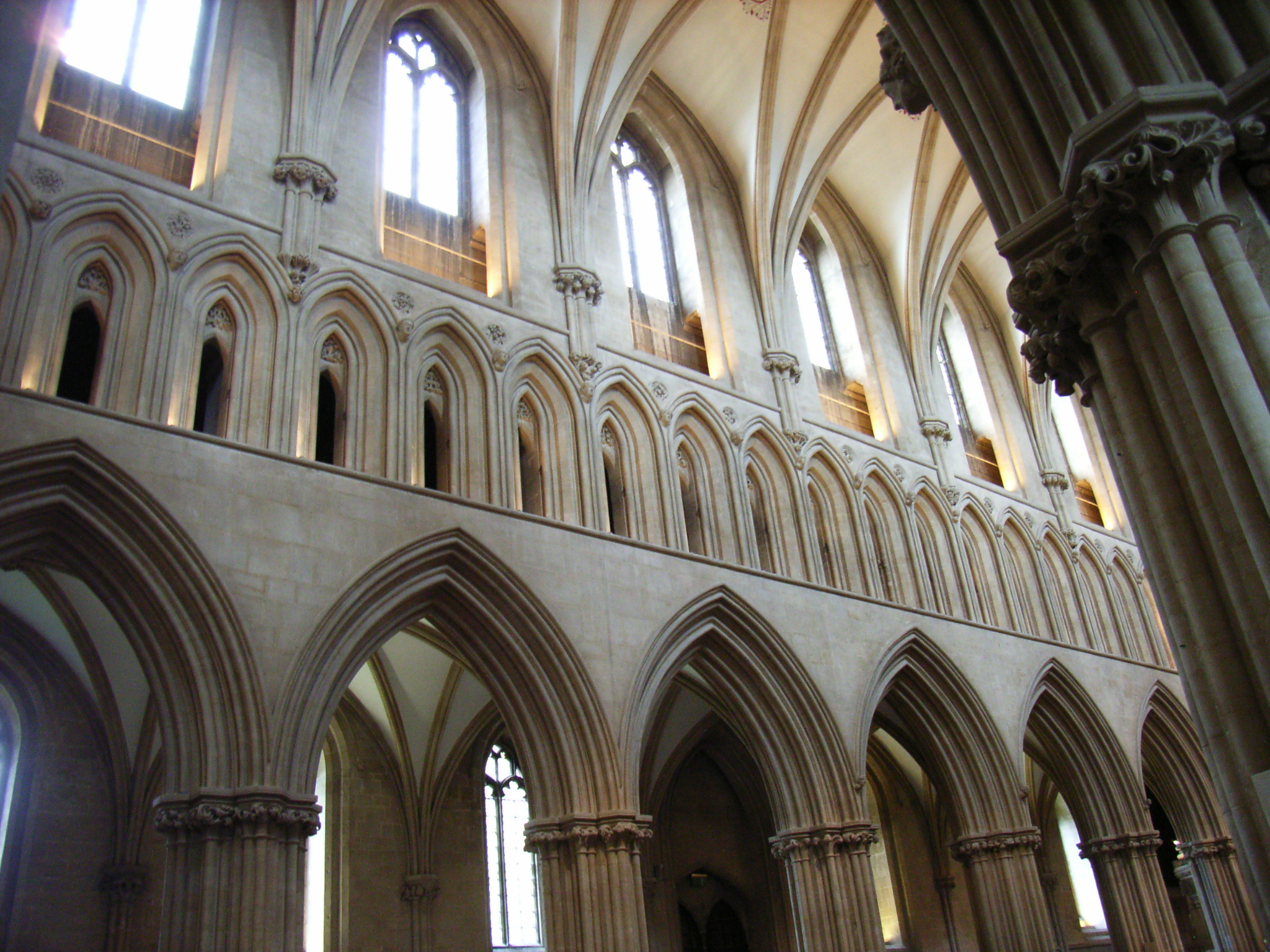
The three levels of the nave (1192–1230) of Wells Cathedral, the first in England to use pointed arches exclusively in the ceiling vaults, the windows of the clerestory and arcades of the triforium, and the arcades on the ground floor

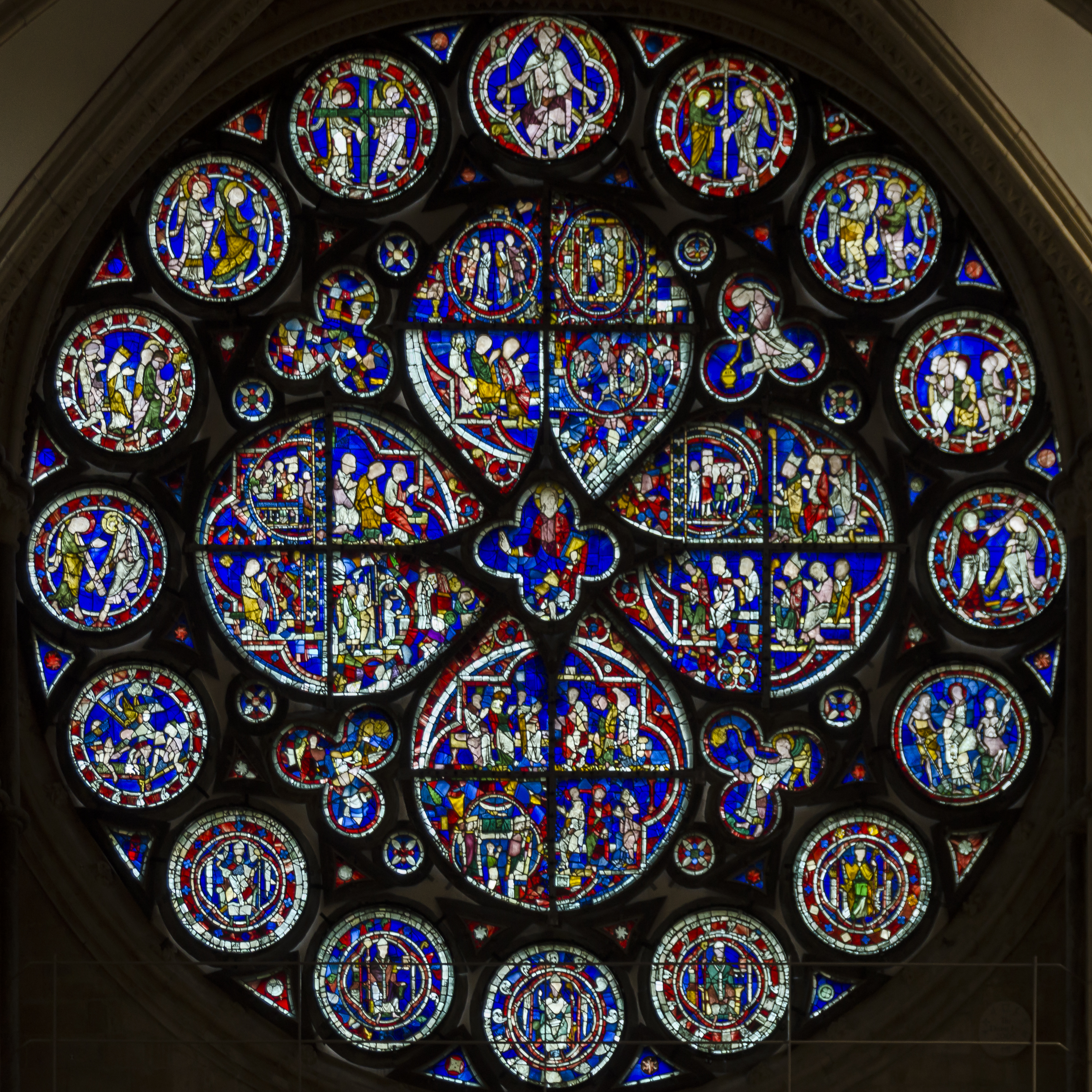
The Dean's Eye Window, a rare English rose window, at Lincoln Cathedral (1220–1235)

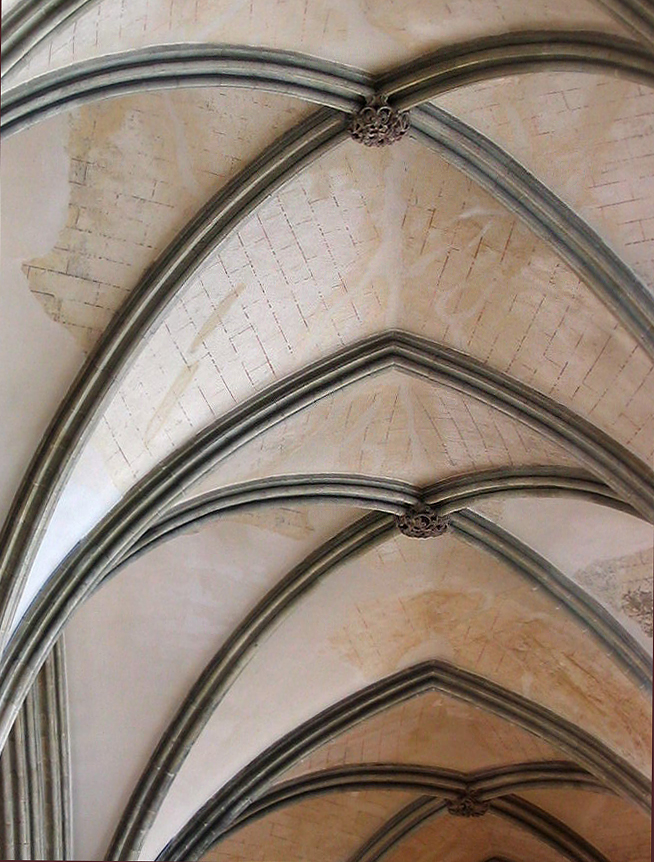
Early four-part rib vaults at Salisbury Cathedral, with a simple carved stone boss at the meeting point of the ribs (1220–1258)

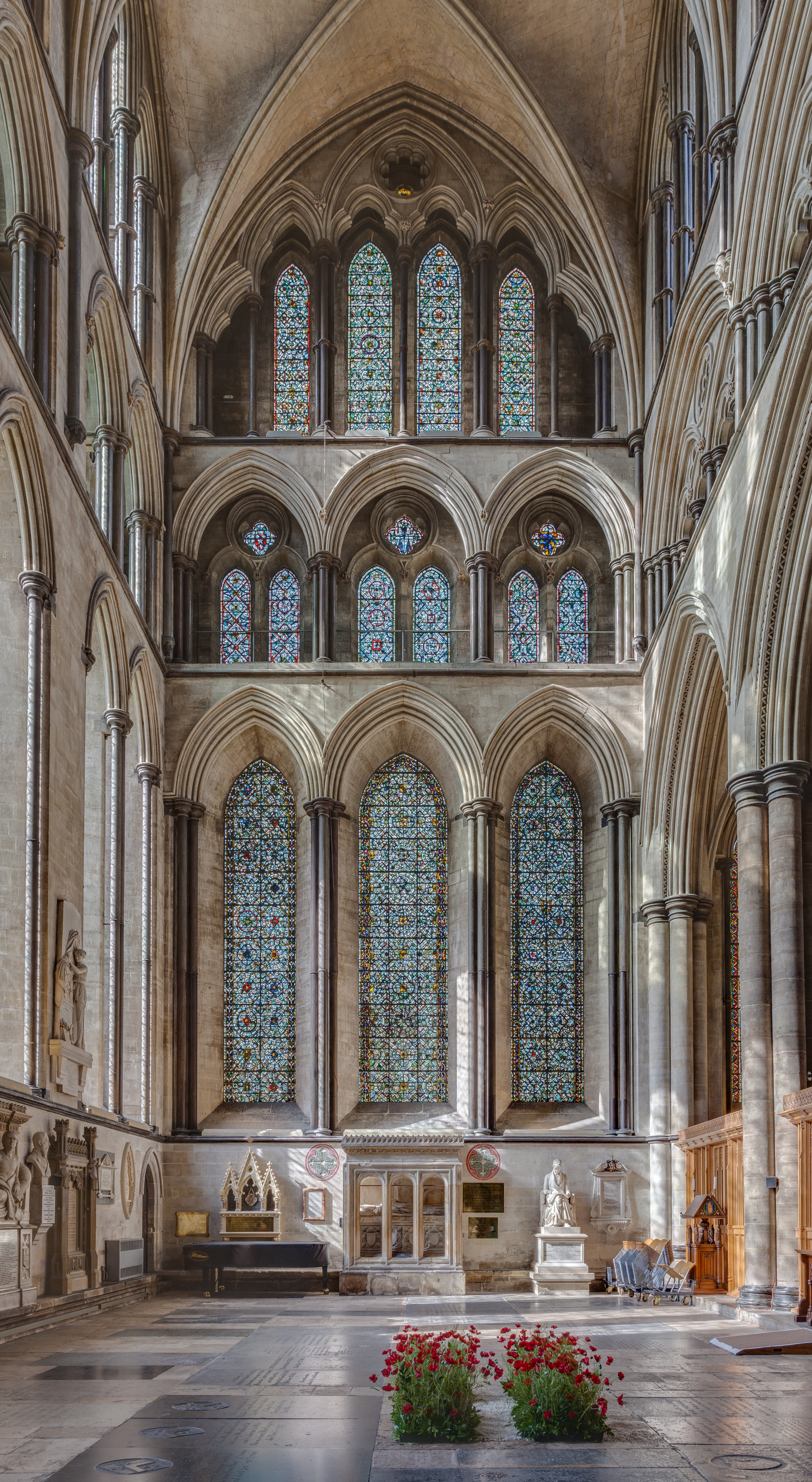
Lancet windows in the north transept of Salisbury Cathedral (1220–1258)
- The vertical plan of early Gothic cathedrals had three levels, each of about equal height; the clerestory, with arched windows which admitted light on top, under the roof vaults; the triforium a wider covered arcade, in the middle; and, on the ground floor, on either side of the nave, wide arcades of columns and pillars, which supported the weight of the ceiling vaults through the ribs
- The most distinctive element of this period was the pointed arch, (also known as the lancet arch, which was the key feature of the Gothic rib vault, The original purpose of rib vault was to allow a heavier stone ceiling, to replace the wooden roofs of the earlier Norman churches, which frequently caught fire. They also had the benefit of allowing the construction of higher and thinner walls. They appeared first in an early form in Durham Cathedral. Gradually, pointed arches were used not only for rib vaults, but also for all of the arcades and for lancet windows, giving the nave its unified appearance. The first structure in England to be built entirely with the pointed arch was Wells Cathedral (1175–1260), but they were soon used in all cathedrals
- The Early English rib vaults were usually quadripartite, each having four compartments divided by ribs, with each covering one bay of the ceiling. The horizontal ridge ribs intersected the summits of the cross ribs and diagonal ribs, and carried the weight outwards and downwards to pillars or columns of the triforium and arcades, and, in later cathedrals, outside the walls to the buttresses
- The lancet window, narrow and tall with a point at the top, became a common feature of English architecture. For this reason, Early English Gothic is sometimes known as the Lancet style. The Lancet openings of windows and decorative arcading are often grouped in twos or threes. This characteristic is seen throughout Salisbury Cathedral, where groups of two lancet windows line the nave and groups of three line the clerestory. At York Minster the north transept has a cluster of five lancet windows known as the Five Sisters window; each is 50 feet tall and still retains its original glass
- Stained glass windows began to be widely used in the windows of the clerestory, transept and especially west façade. Many were elaborately decorated with tracery; that is, thin mullions or ribs of stone which divided the windows into elaborate geometric patterns, as at Lincoln Cathedral (1220)
- Rose Windows were relatively rare in England, but Lincoln Cathedral has two notable examples from this period. The oldest is the Dean's Window in the north transept, which dates to 1220–1235. It is an example of an Early English plate-tracery rose window. The geometric design, with concentric tiers of circular window lights, predates the geometric tracery of the later decorated style of Gothic architecture. The principal theme of the window is the second coming of Christ and the last judgement. Some scenes are associated with death and resurrection, such as the funeral of Saint Hugh, the founder of the cathedral, and the death of the Virgin
- Square east end. The typical arrangement for an English Gothic east end is square, and may be an unbroken cliff-like design as at York, Lincoln, Ripon, Ely and Carlisle or may have a projecting lady chapel of which there is a great diversity as at Salisbury, Lichfield, Hereford, Exeter and Chichester
- Sculptural decoration. Unlike the more sombre and heavy Norman churches, the Gothic churches began to have elaborate sculptural decoration. The arches of the arcades and triforium were sometimes decorated with dog tooth patterns, cusps, carved circles, and with trefoils, quatrefoils, as well as floral and vegetal designs. Simple floral motifs such as stiff-leaf also often appeared on the capitals, the spandrels, the roof boss that joined the ribs of the vaults
- The clustered column. Instead of being massive, solid pillars, early Gothic columns were often composed of clusters of slender, detached shafts, which descended the vaults above. These were often made of dark, polished Purbeck "marble", surrounding a central pillar, or pier, to which they are attached by circular moulded shaft-rings. One characteristic of Early Gothic in England is the great depth given to the hollows of the mouldings with alternating fillets and rolls, and by the decoration of the hollows with the dog-tooth ornament and by the circular abacus or tops of the capitals of the columns

=== Examples ===
- the east end of Canterbury Cathedral (1174–1184) rebuilt by French masons following a fire
- Chepstow Castle, much of the curtain walls, main gatehouse and upper part of the great tower
- at Chester Cathedral; the chapter house (1249–1265) and lady chapel (1265–1290)
- clerestory, vaults and east end of Chichester Cathedral (1187–1199)
- Corfe Castle, curtain walls and Gloriette
- Dunblane Cathedral
- Chapel of Nine Altars at Durham Cathedral (1242–1280)
- presbytery of Ely Cathedral (1234–1254)
- Fountains Abbey; east end of church, Chapel of the Nine Altars, refectory and cellarium
- Glasgow Cathedral
- at Hereford Cathedral; the lady chapel (1217–1225) and upper part of the choir (1235–1240)
- at Lichfield Cathedral; the chapter house (1239–1249), choir and transepts
- Lincoln Cathedral, chapter house and bishop's palace (1192–1255; not including the Angel Choir, towers and cloisters)
- Pembroke Castle, great tower
- west front of Peterborough Cathedral (1200–1222)
- east end and transept of Rochester Cathedral (1200–1227)
- Rievaulx Abbey; east end of church and refectory
- Ripon Cathedral, west front
- presbytery of St. Albans Cathedral (1235–1250)
- Salisbury Cathedral (1220–1266; not including Decorated central tower, 1334–1380 and Perpendicular crossing arches, 1388–1395)
- east end of Southwark Cathedral
- east end of Southwell Minster (1234–1250)
- transept, nave and west front of Wells Cathedral (1176–1260; western towers added in the Perpendicular period, 1365–1435)
- Whitby Abbey church (excluding nave)
- Winchester Castle, great hall
- retro-choir at Winchester Cathedral (1189–1193; not including the lady chapel)
- the east end of Worcester Cathedral (1202–1218)
- great transept of York Minster (1226–1255)

== Decorated Gothic (late 13th–late 14th centuries) ==
The second style of English Gothic architecture is generally termed Decorated Gothic, because the amount of ornament and decoration increased dramatically. It corresponded roughly with the Rayonnant period in France, which influenced it. It was a period of growing prosperity in England, and this was expressed in the decoration of Gothic buildings. Almost every feature of the interiors and facades was decorated.

Geometric Decorated

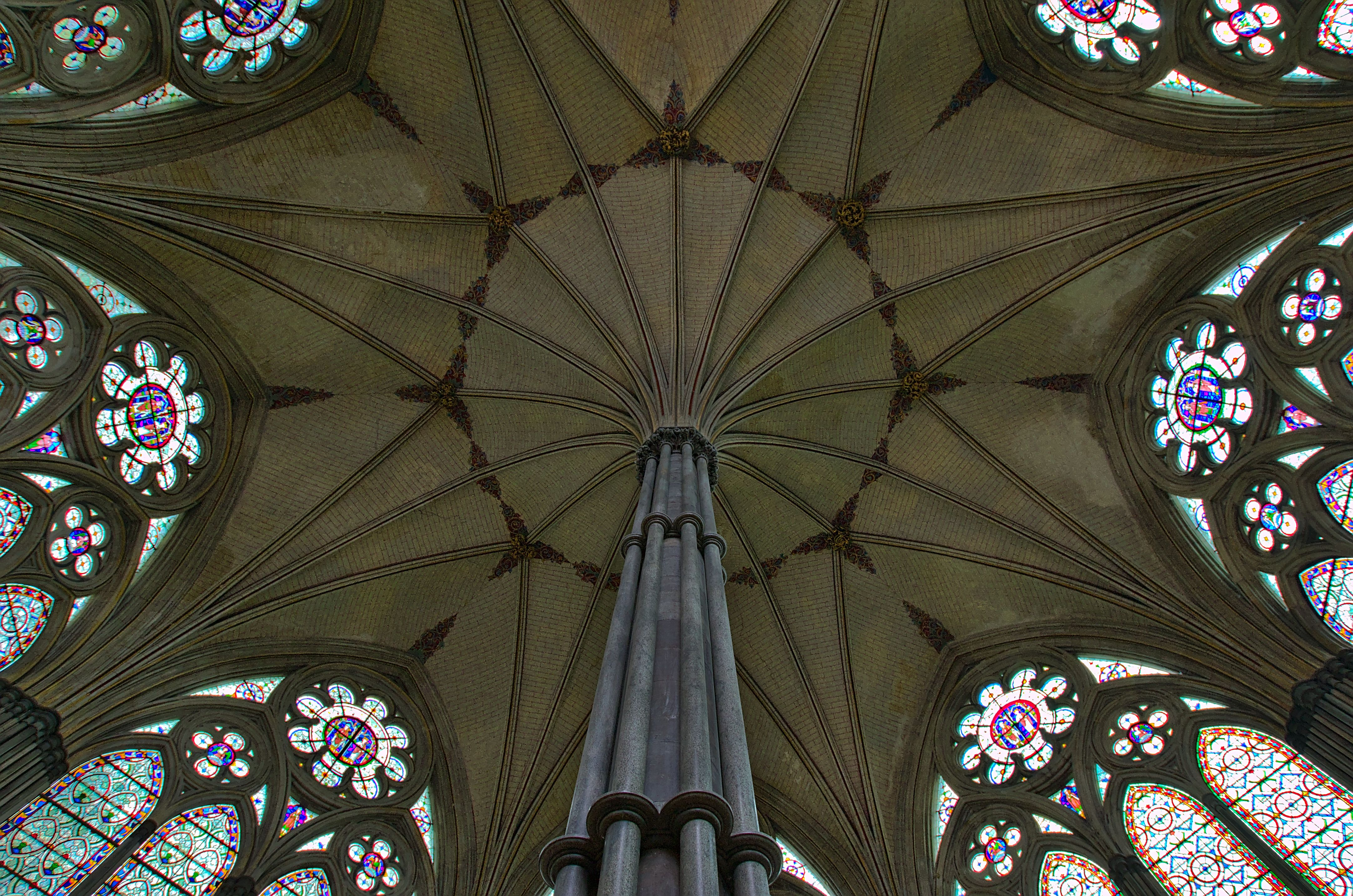
The vault of the chapter house at Salisbury Cathedral (1275–1285)

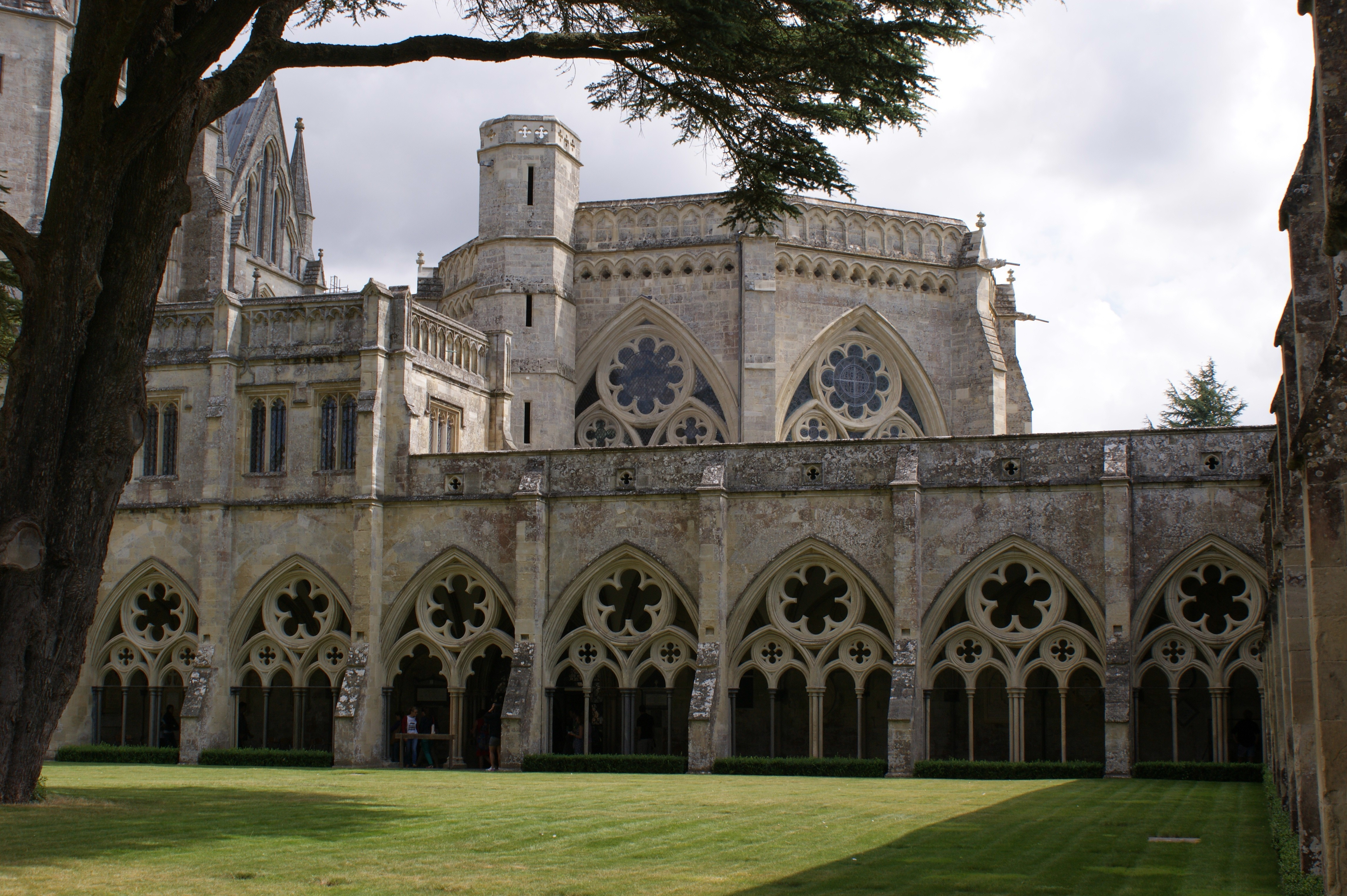
Salisbury Cathedral chapter house and cloisters

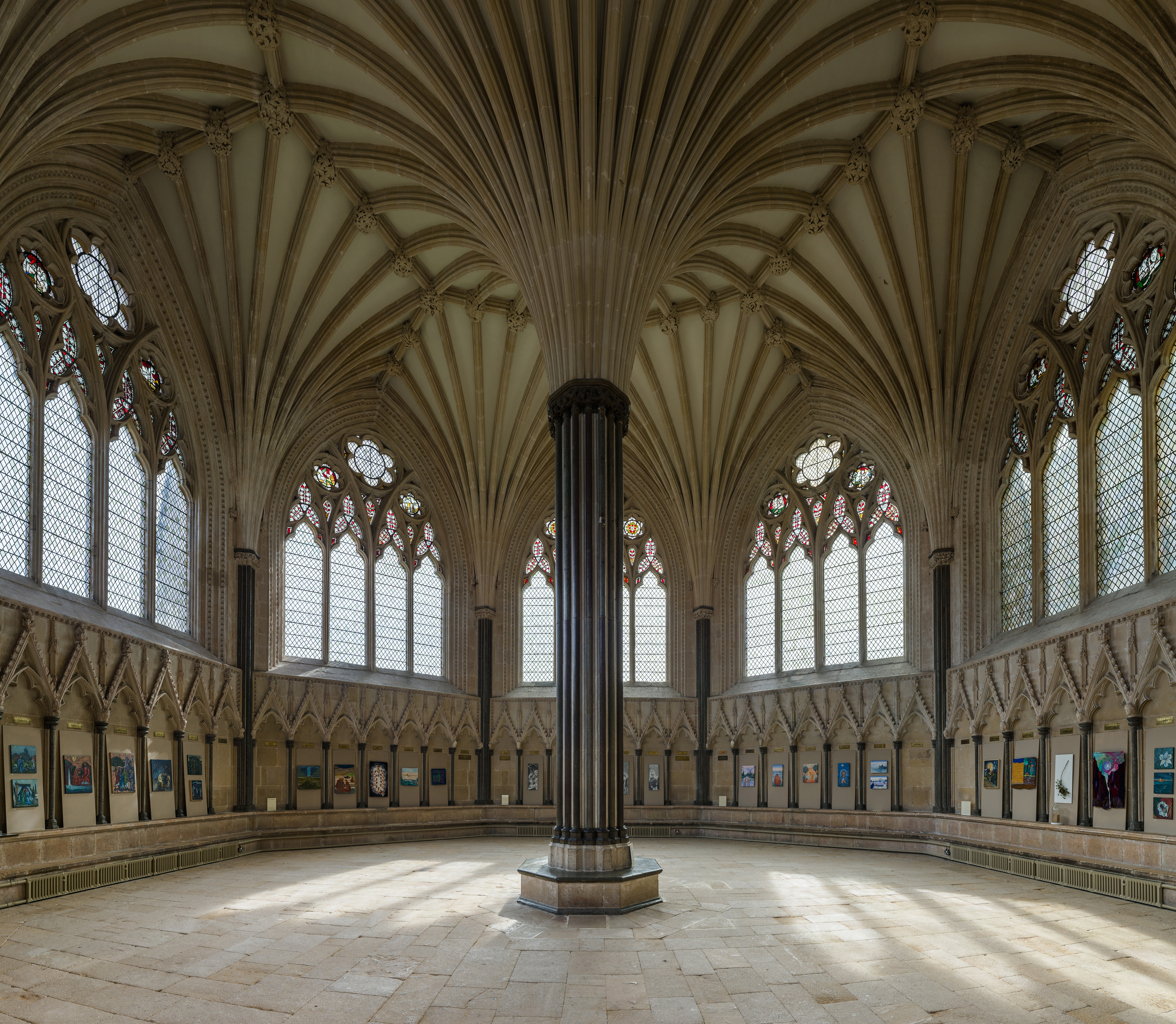
Wells Cathedral chapter house

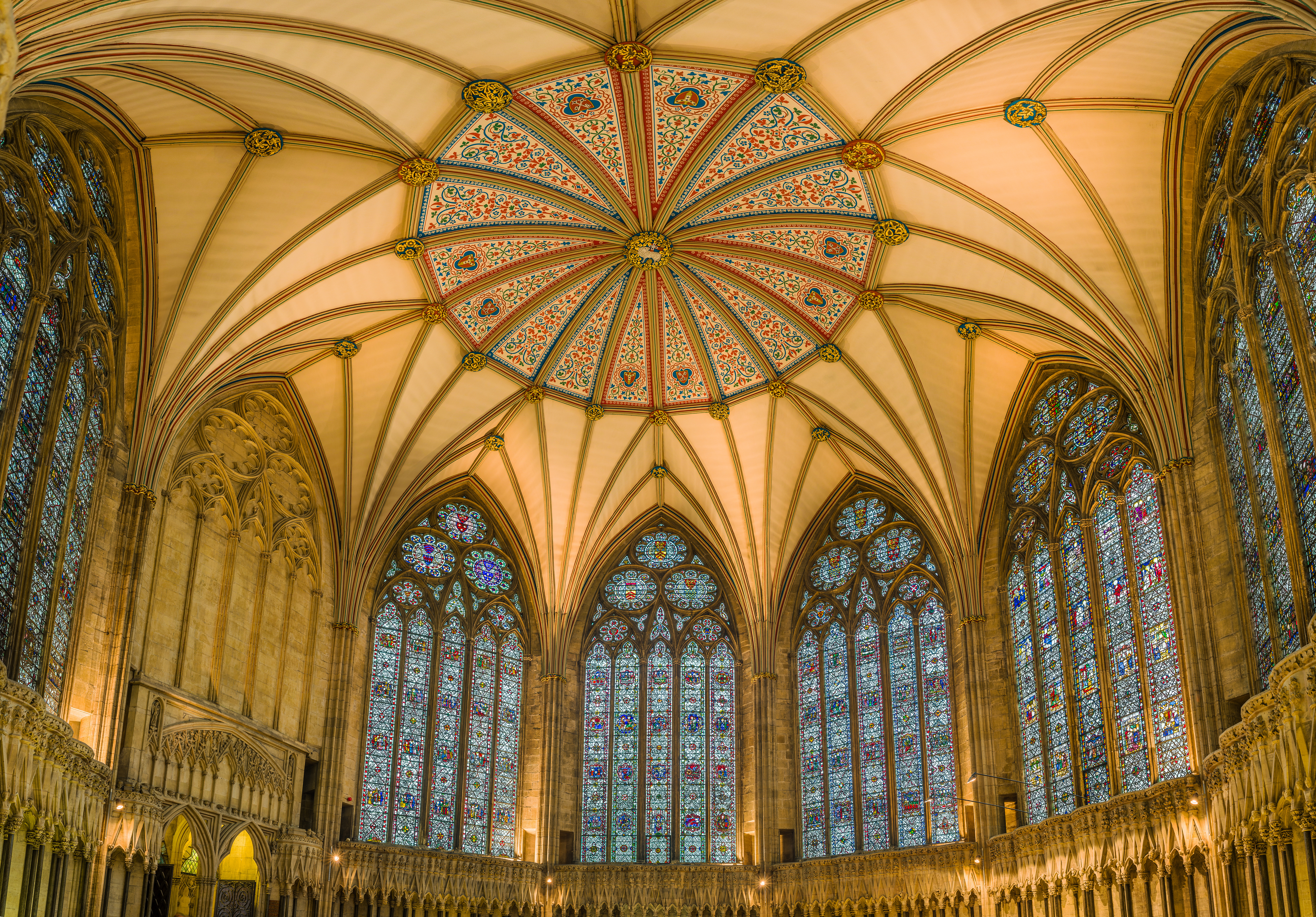
York Minster chapter house

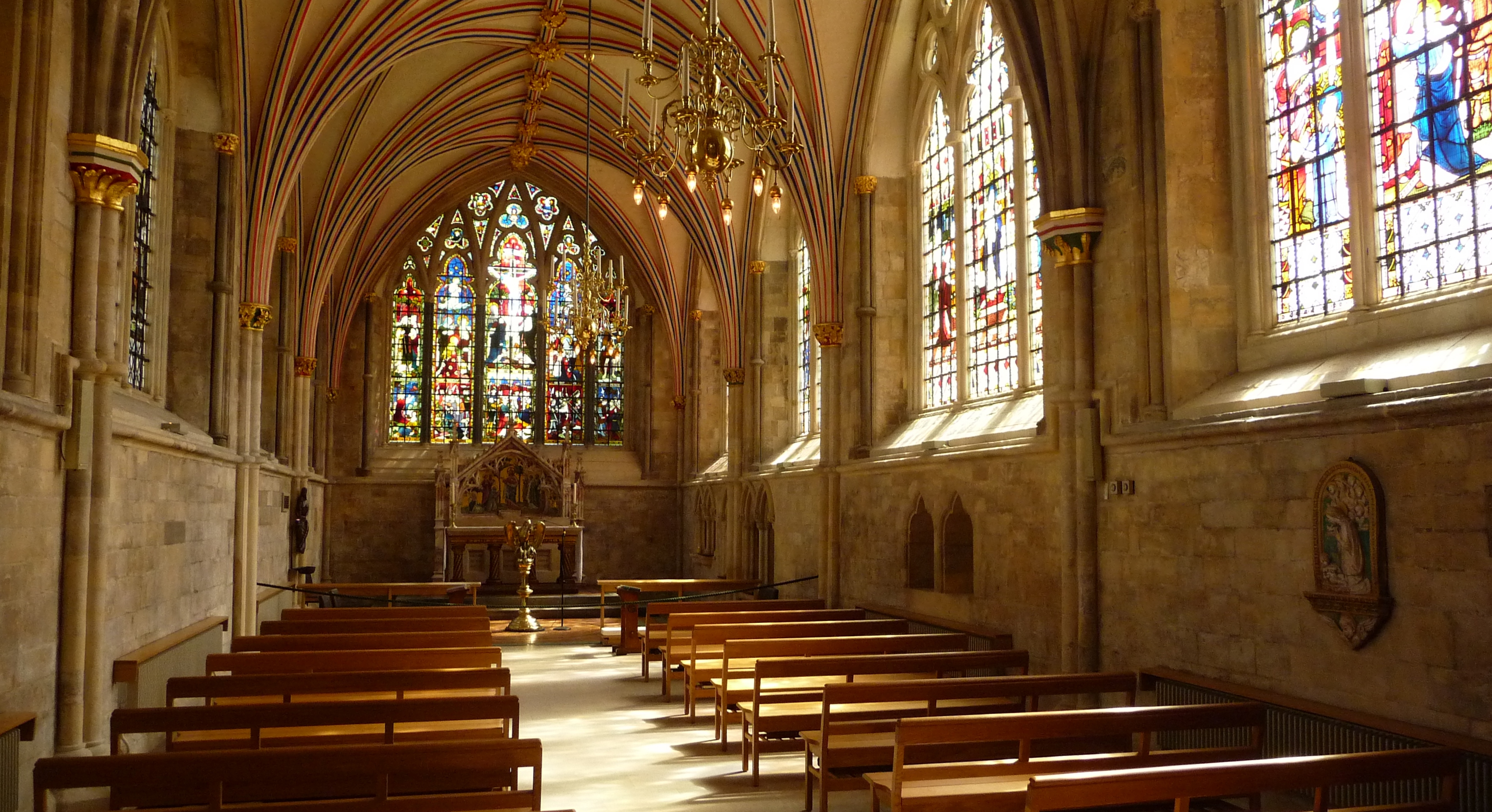
Chichester Cathedral Lady chapel

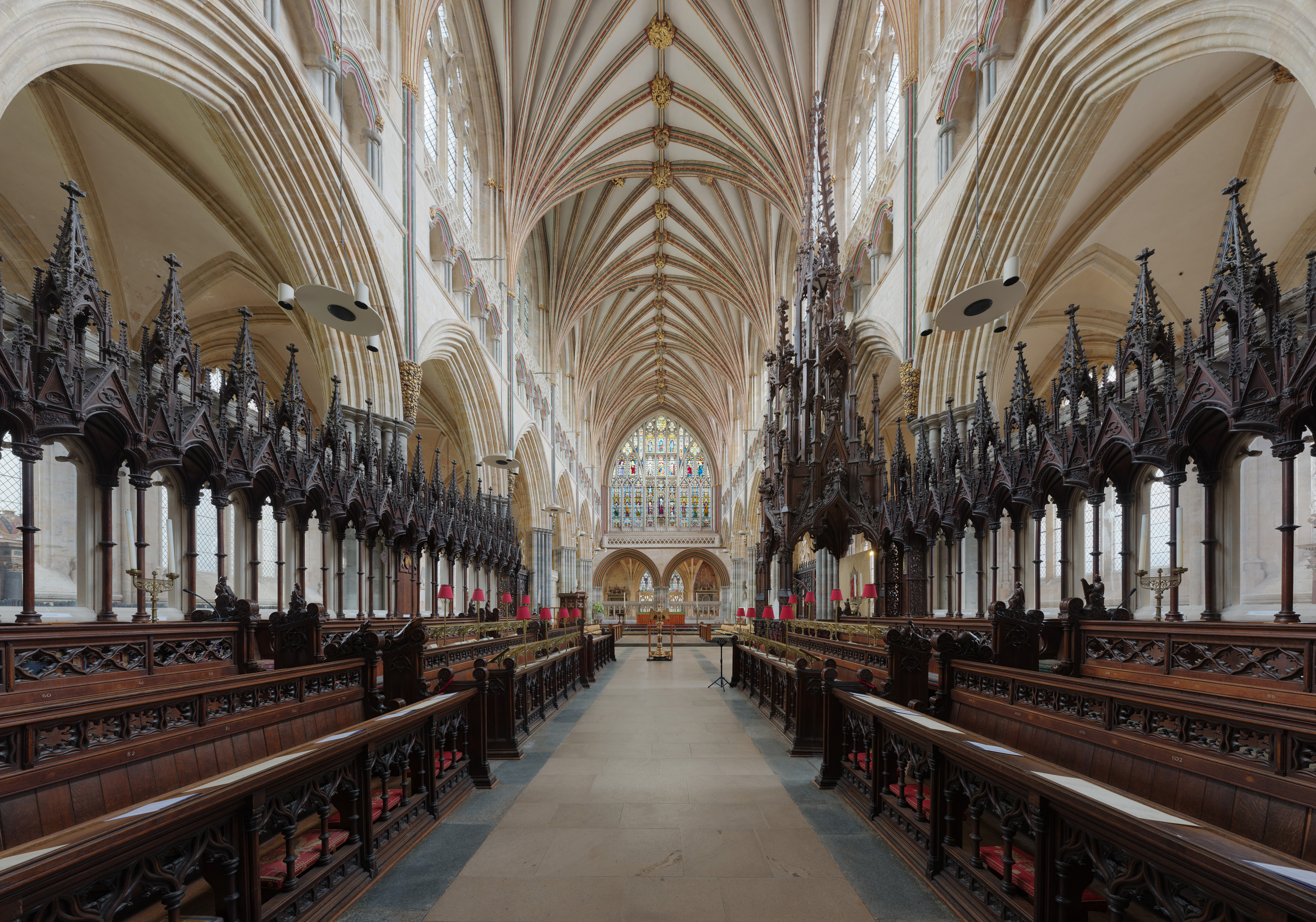
Exeter Cathedral choir

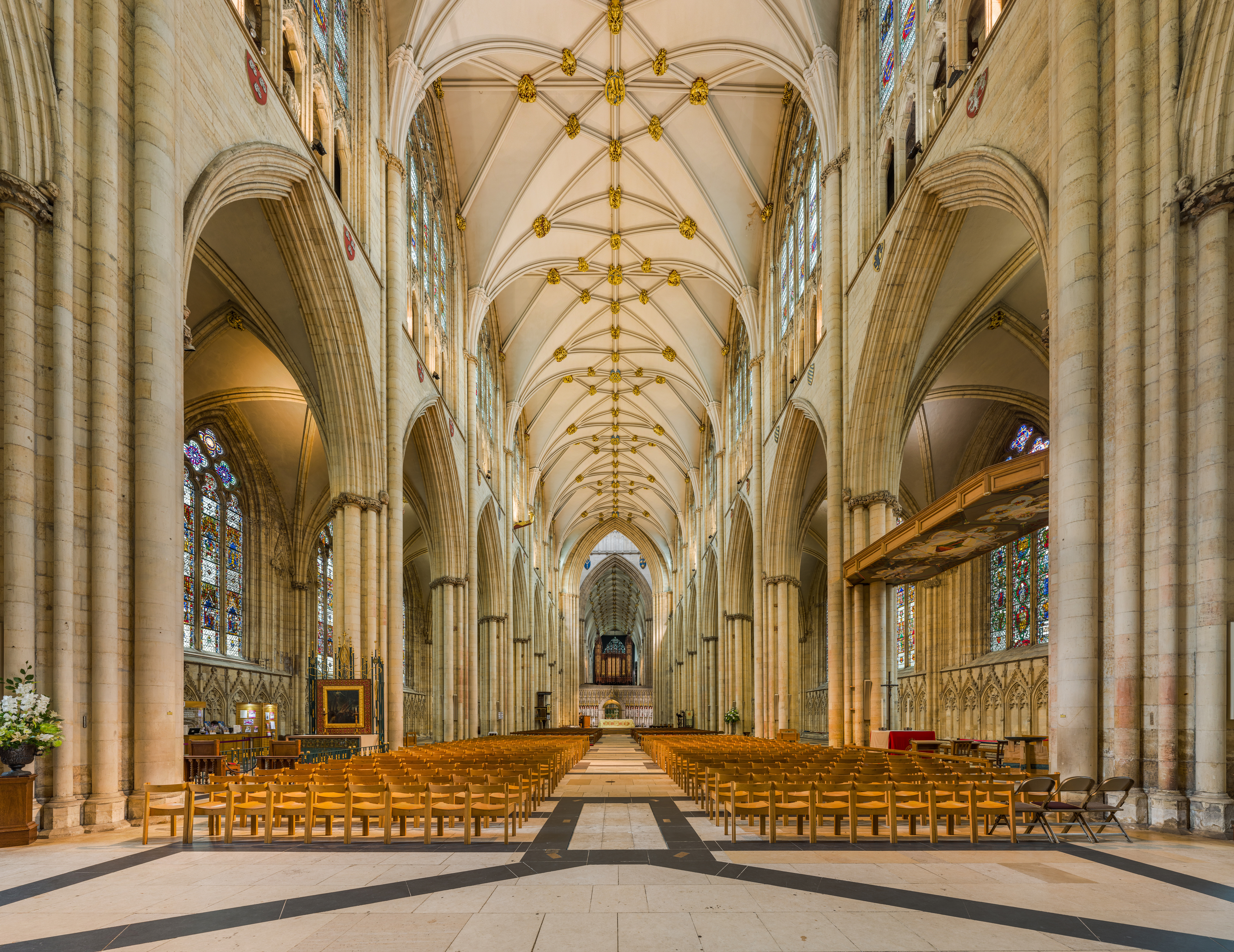
York Minster nave

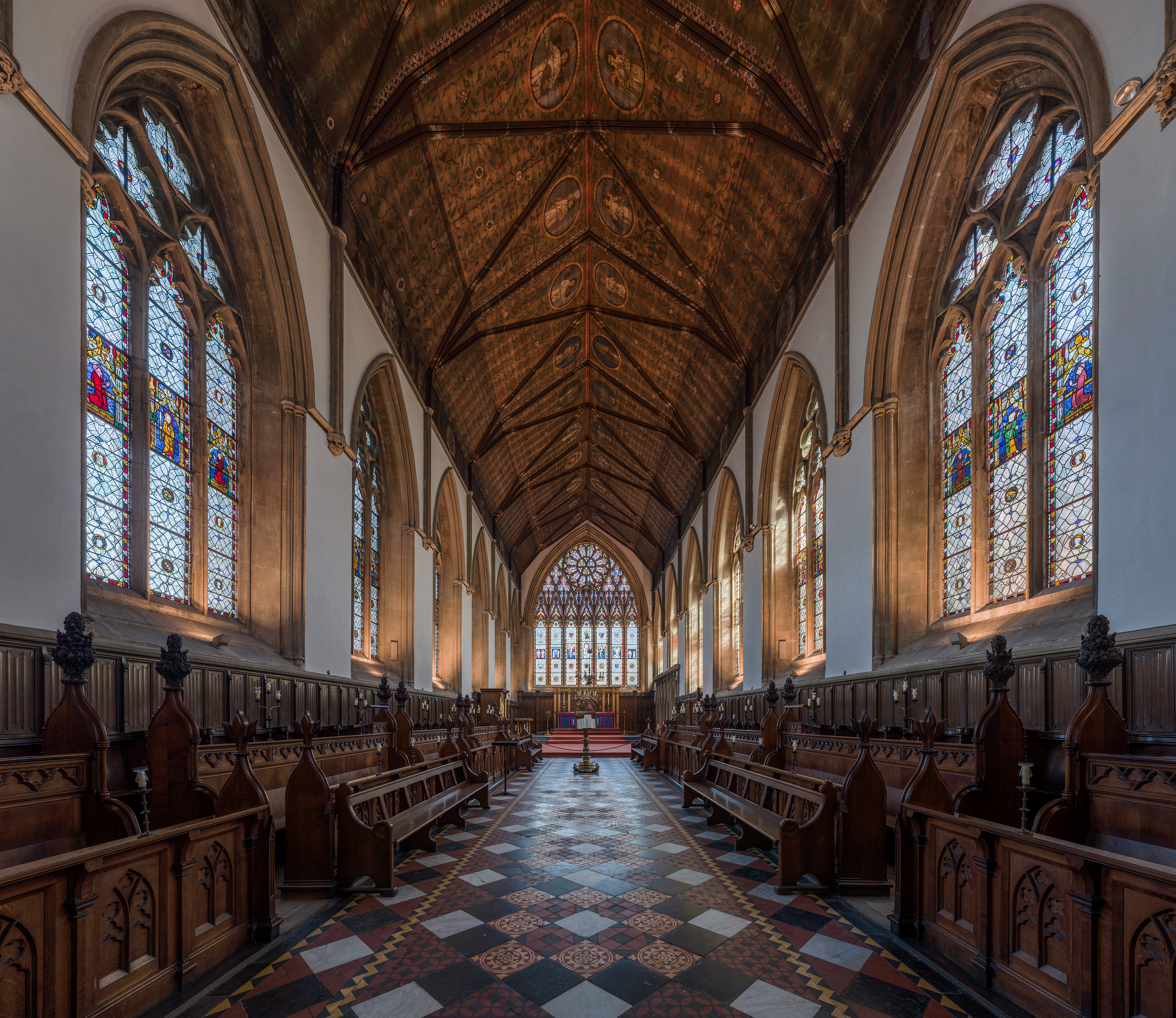
Merton College Chapel

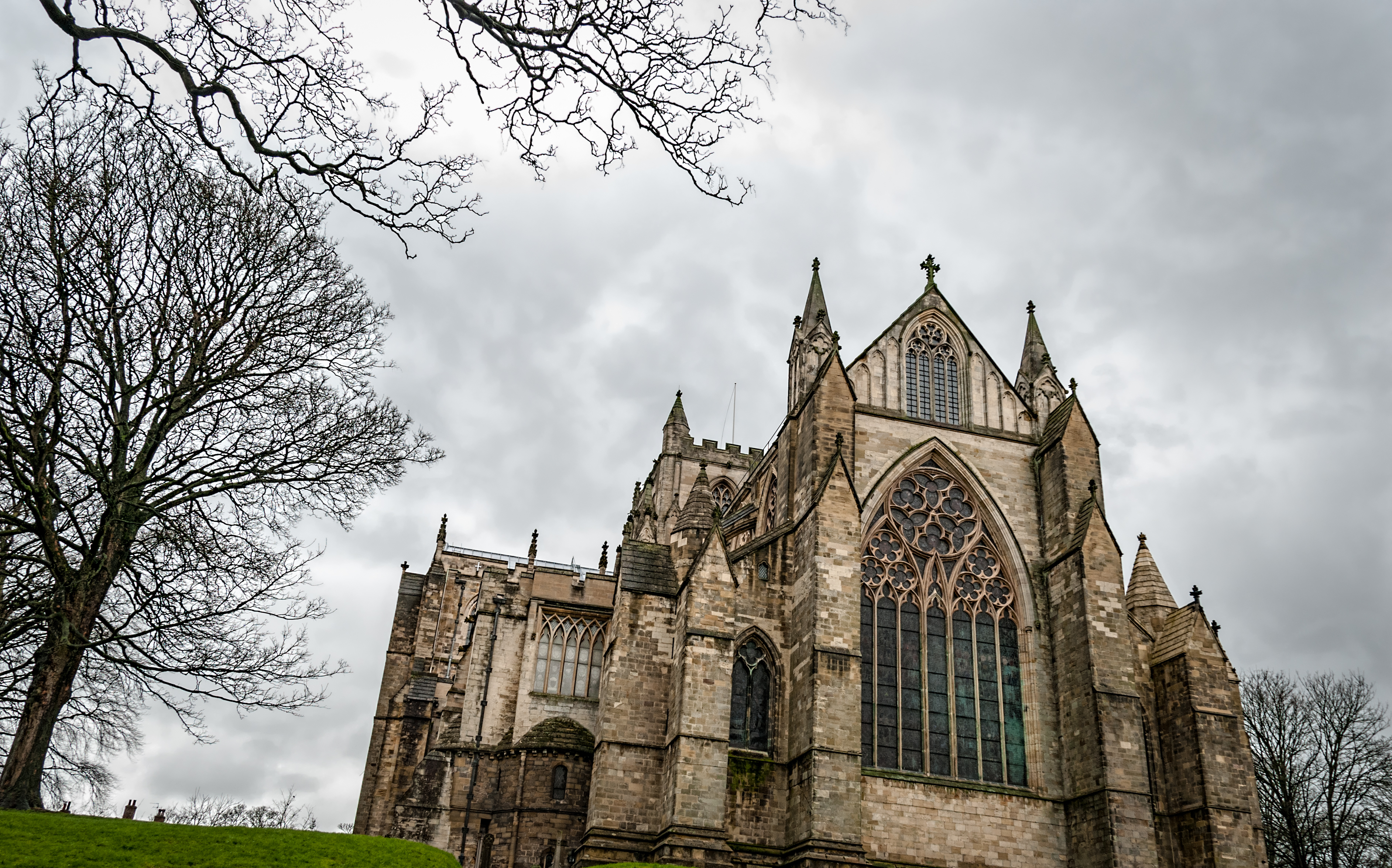
Ripon Cathedral east end

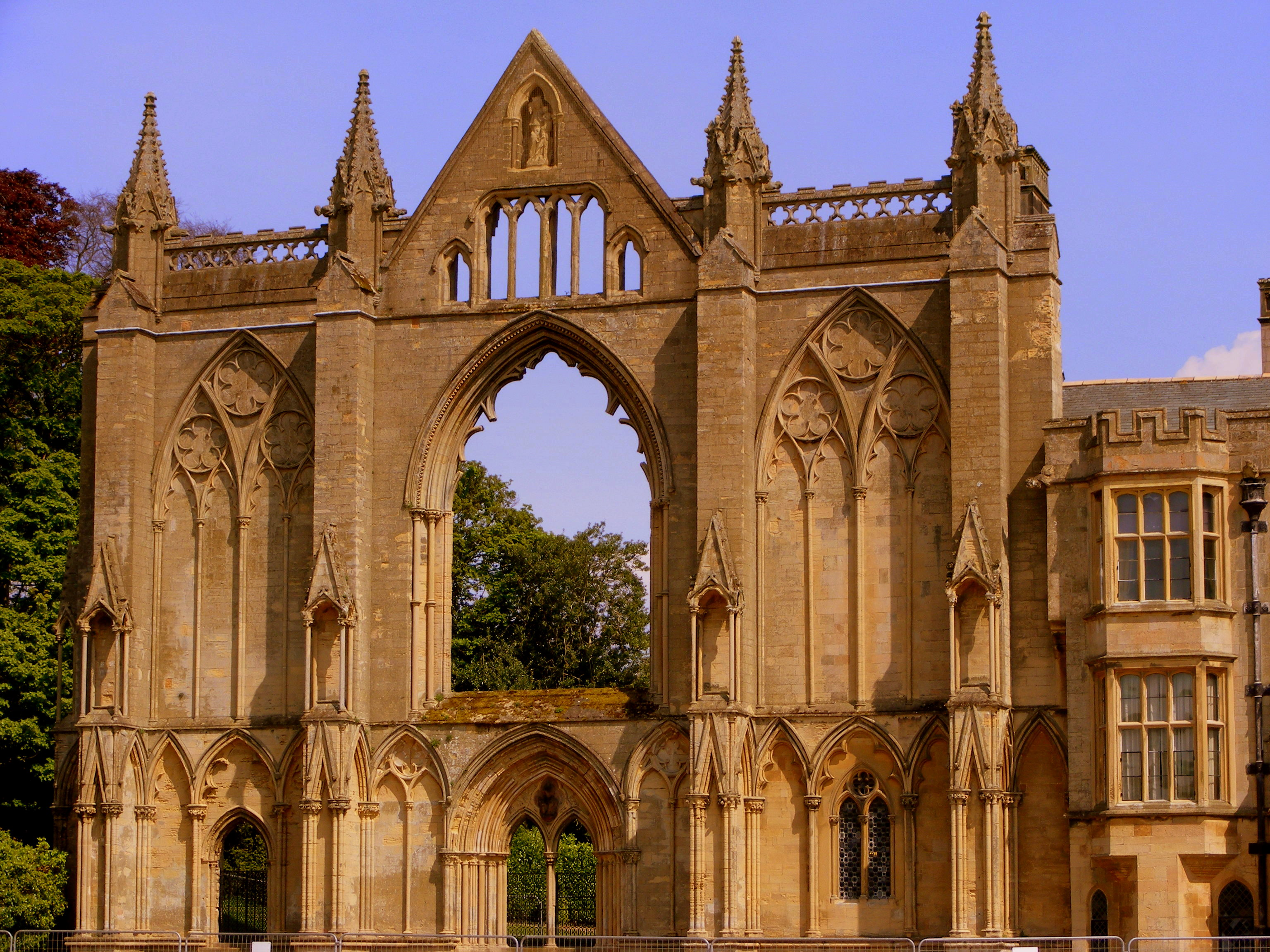
Newstead Abbey, Nottinghamshire, west front
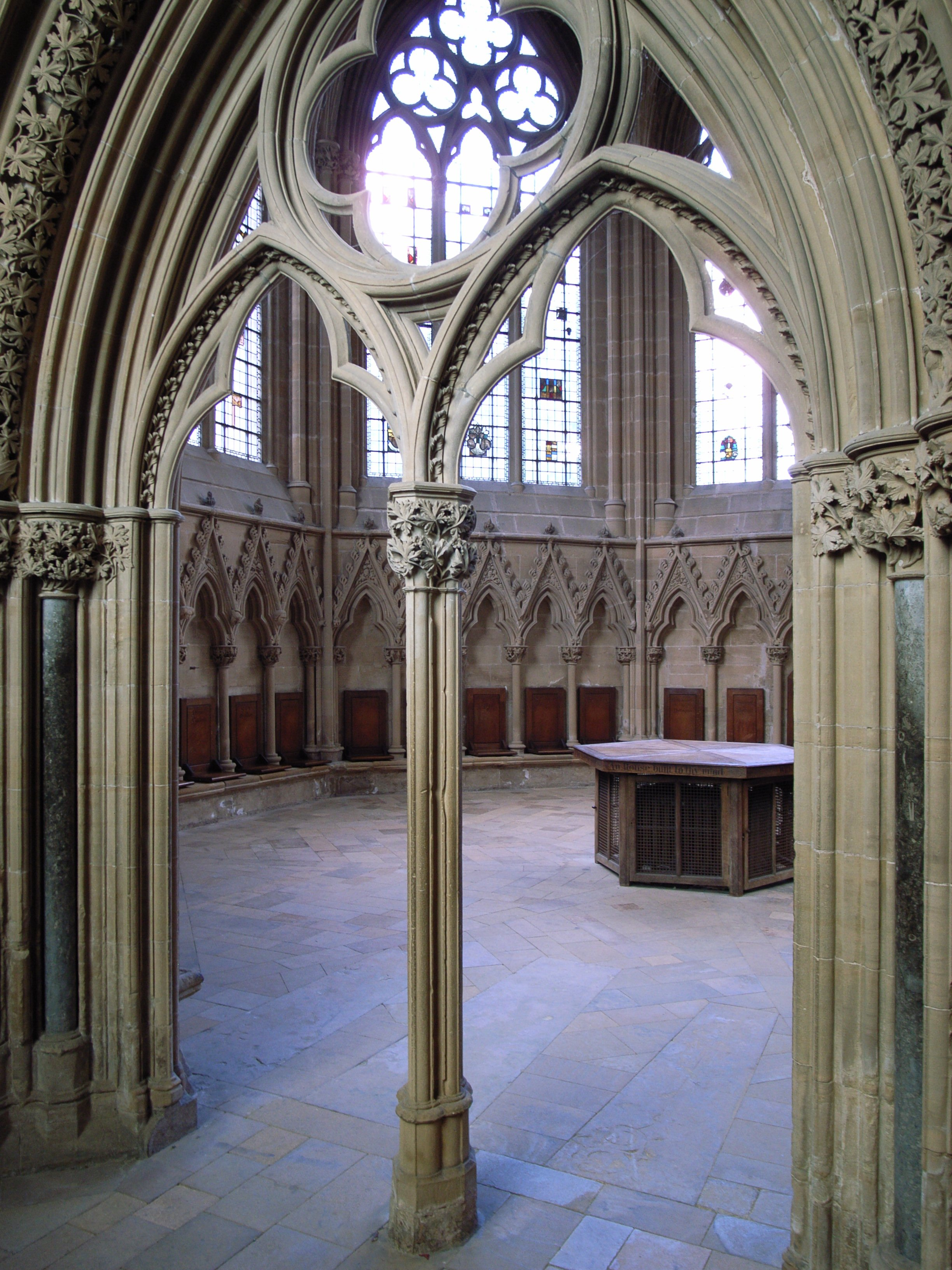
Southwell Minster, Nottinghamshire, chapter house

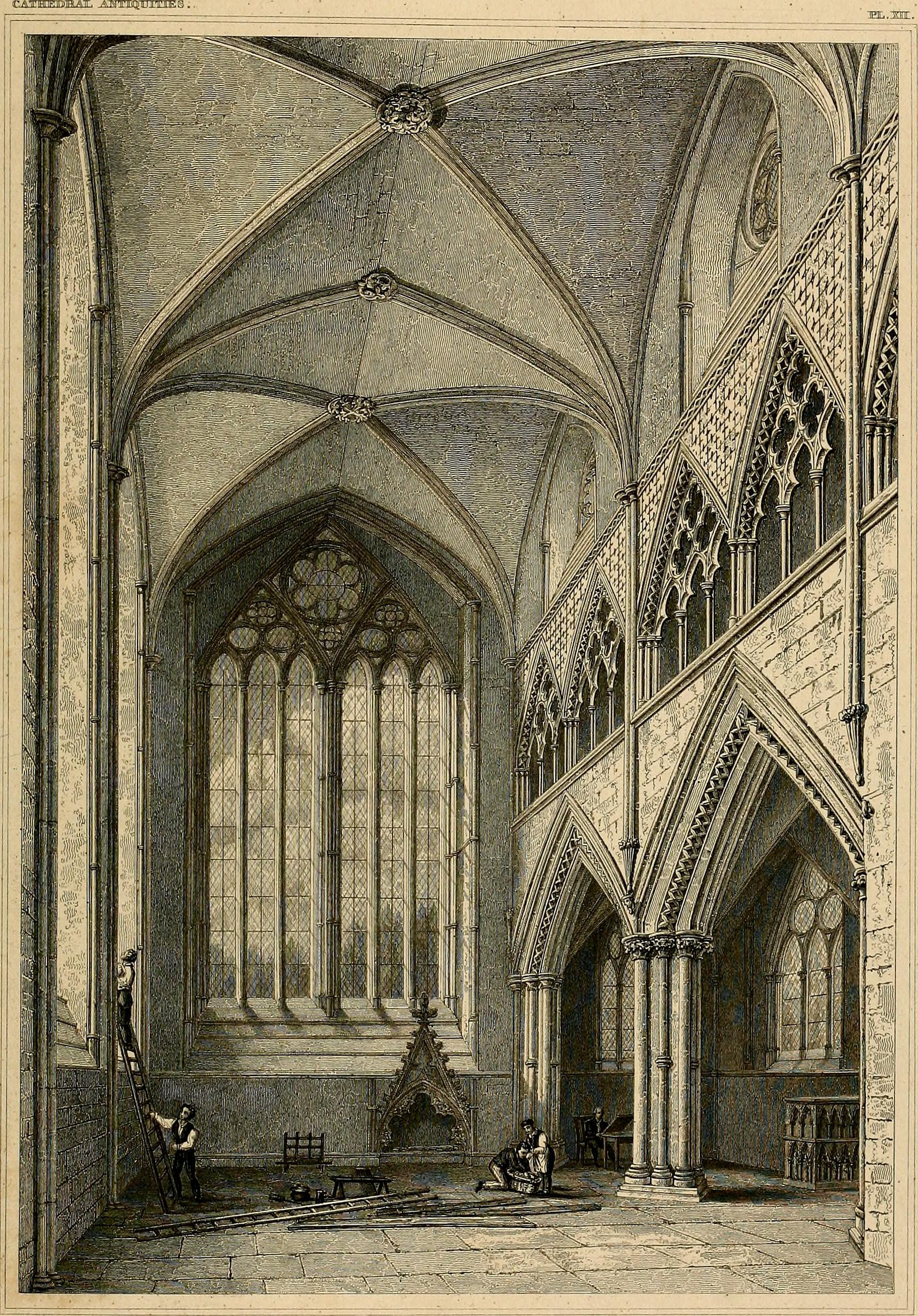
Hereford Cathedral north transept

Historians sometimes subdivide this style into two periods, based on the predominant motifs of the designs. The first, the Geometric style, lasted from about 1245 or 50 until 1315 or 1360, where ornament tended to be based on pointed arches, cusps and circles, followed by the Curvilinear style (from about 1290 or 1315 until 1350 or 1360) which used gracefully curving (ogee) lines.

Curvilinear Decorated

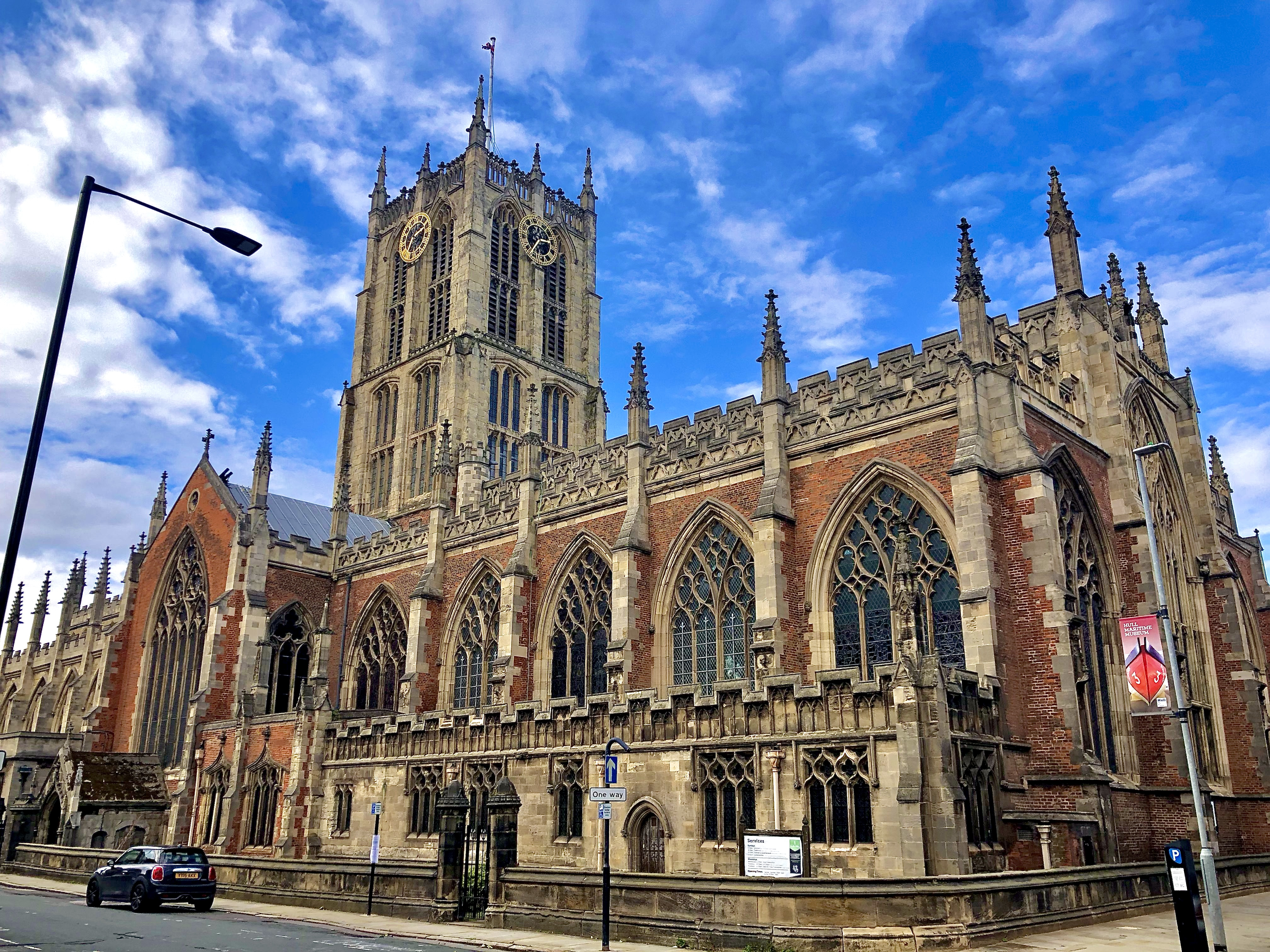
Hull Minster chancel

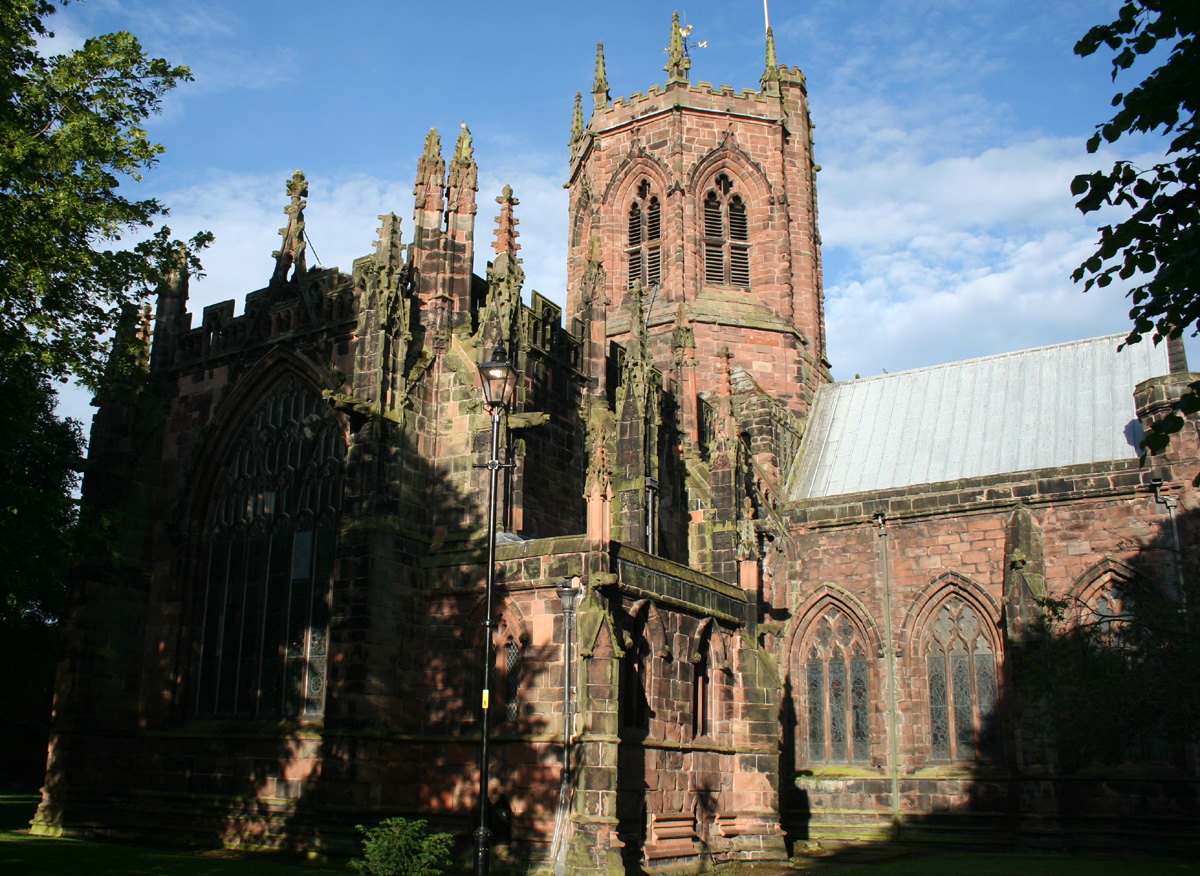
St Mary's Church, Nantwich, east end

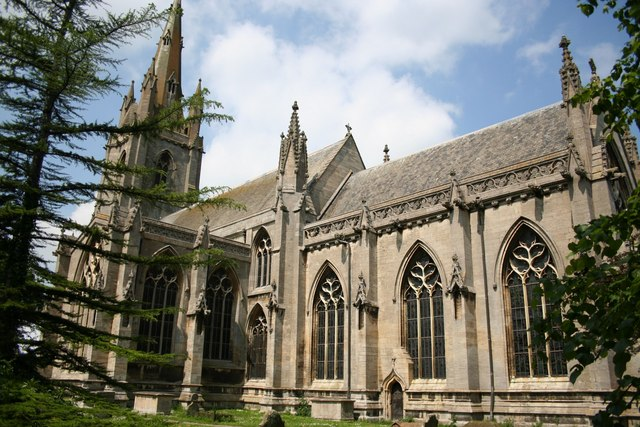
St. Andrew's Church, Heckington

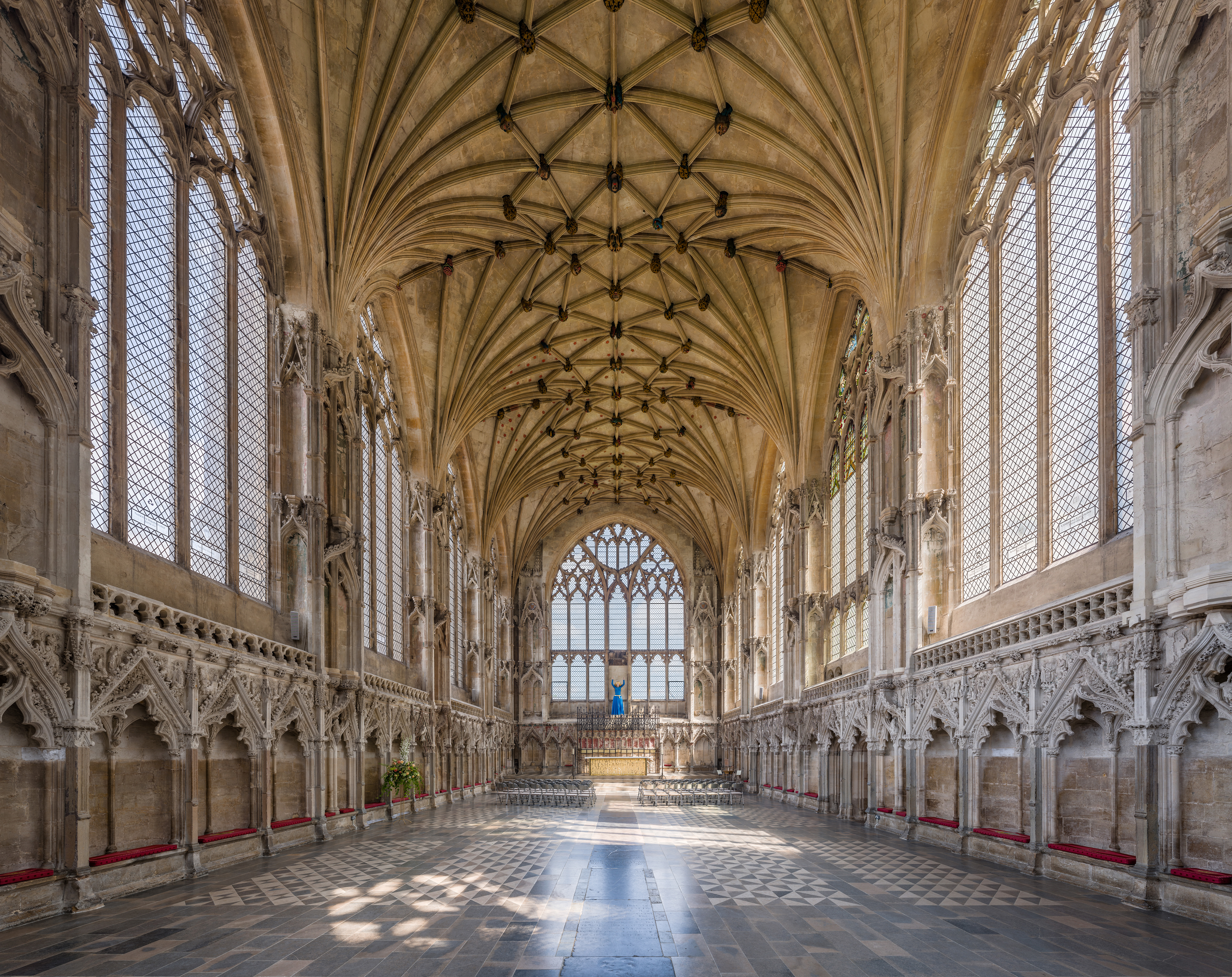
Ely Cathedral Lady chapel (1321–1351)

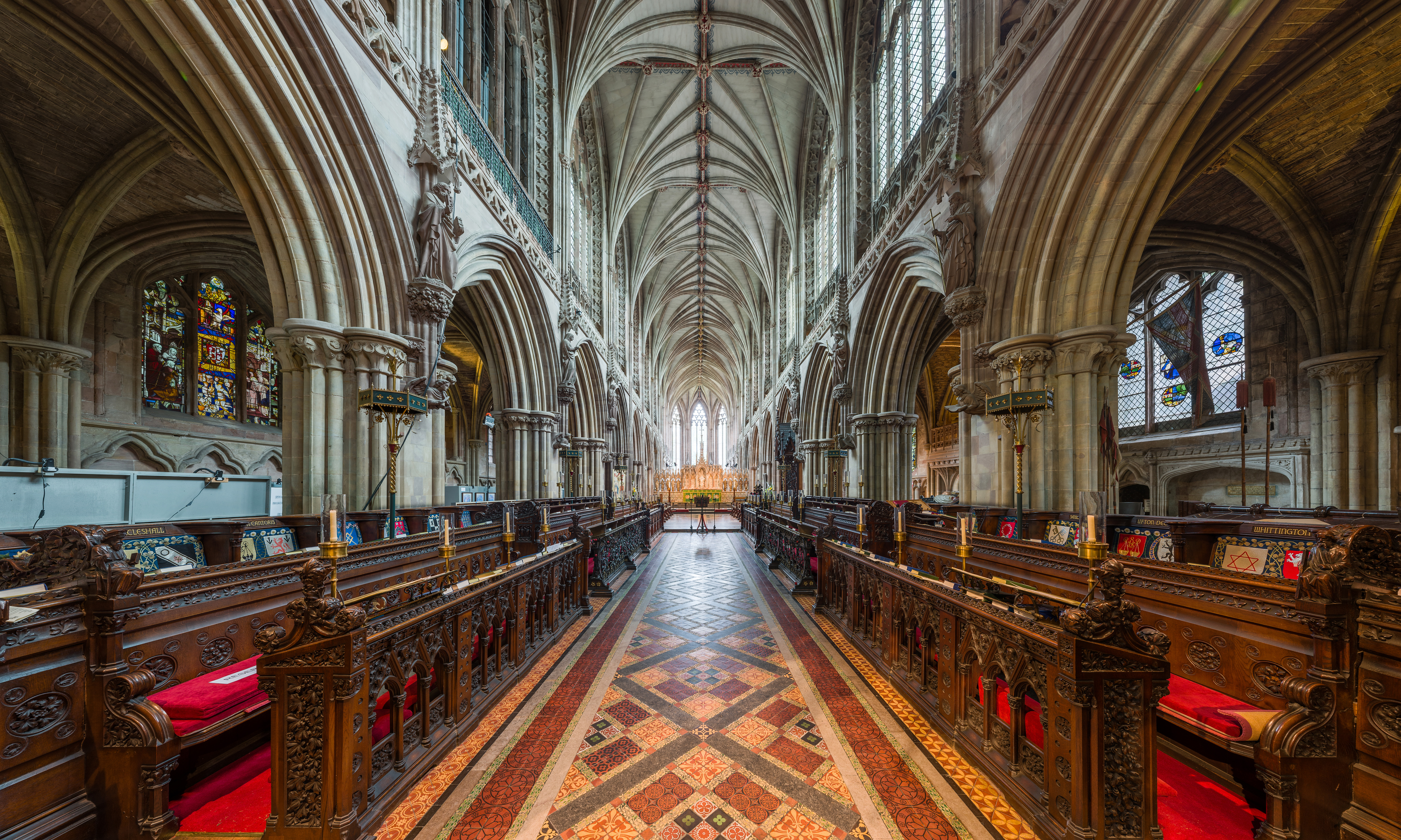
Lichfield Cathedral choir

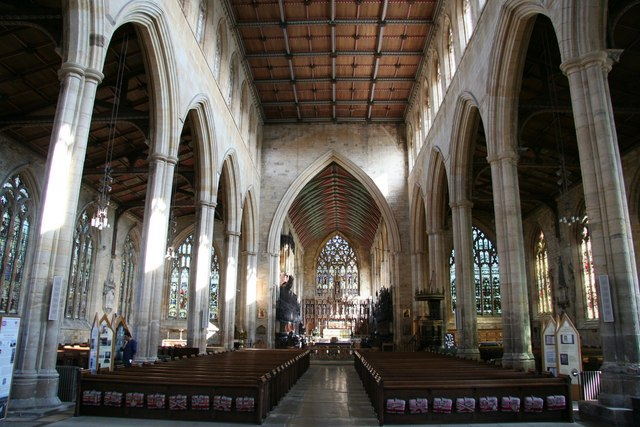
St Botolph's Church, Boston, nave

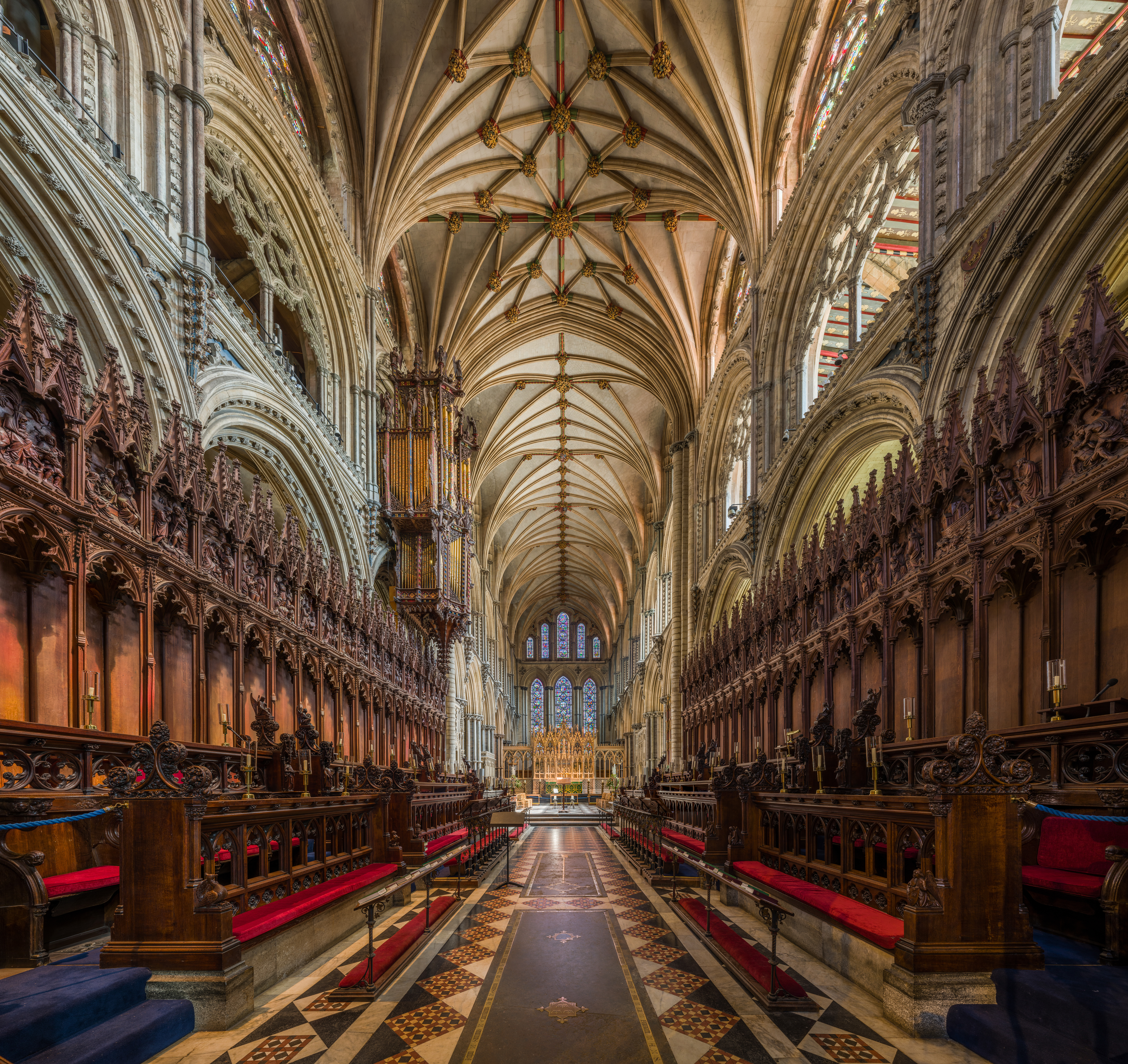
Ely Cathedral choir

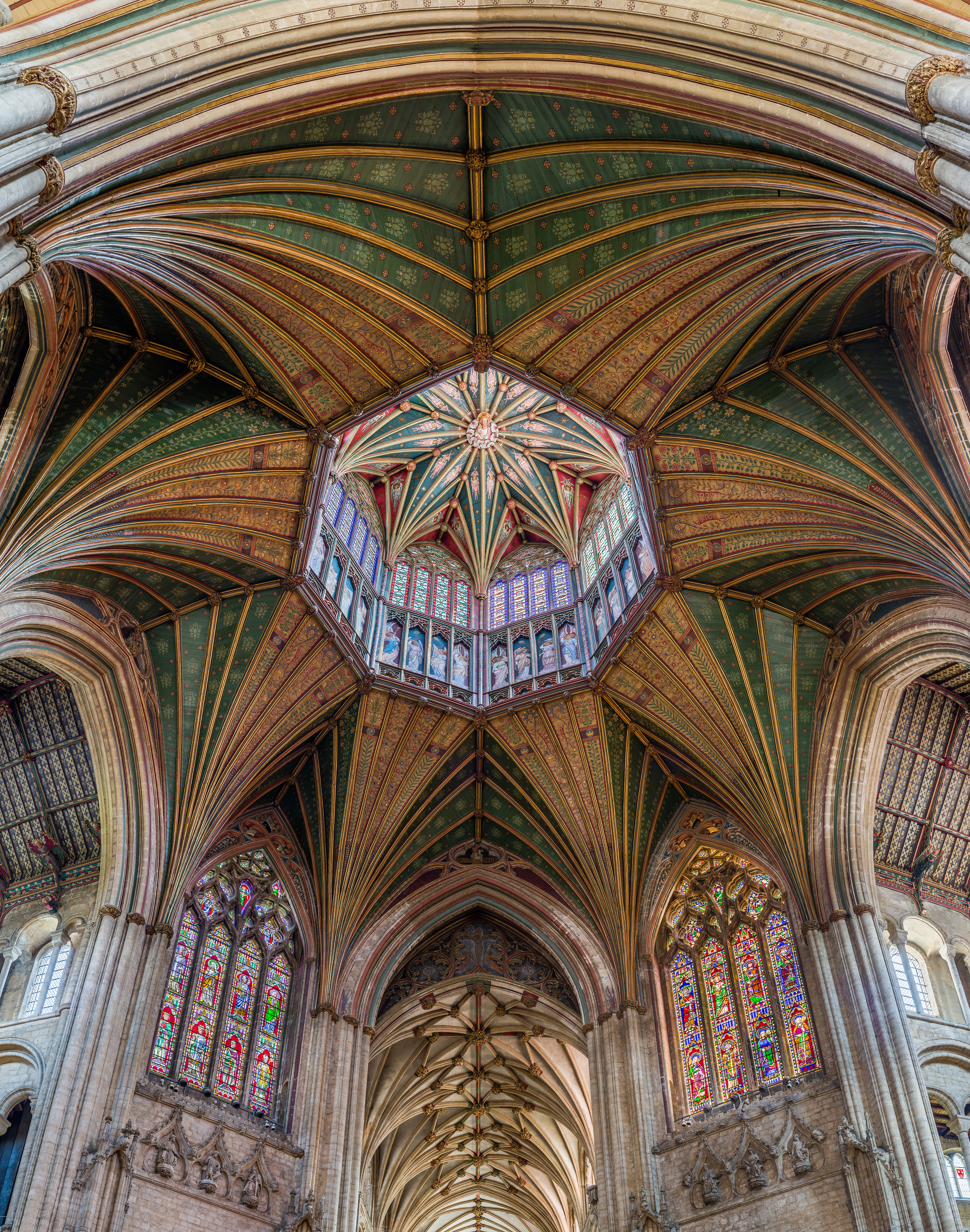
Ely Cathedral crossing and lantern

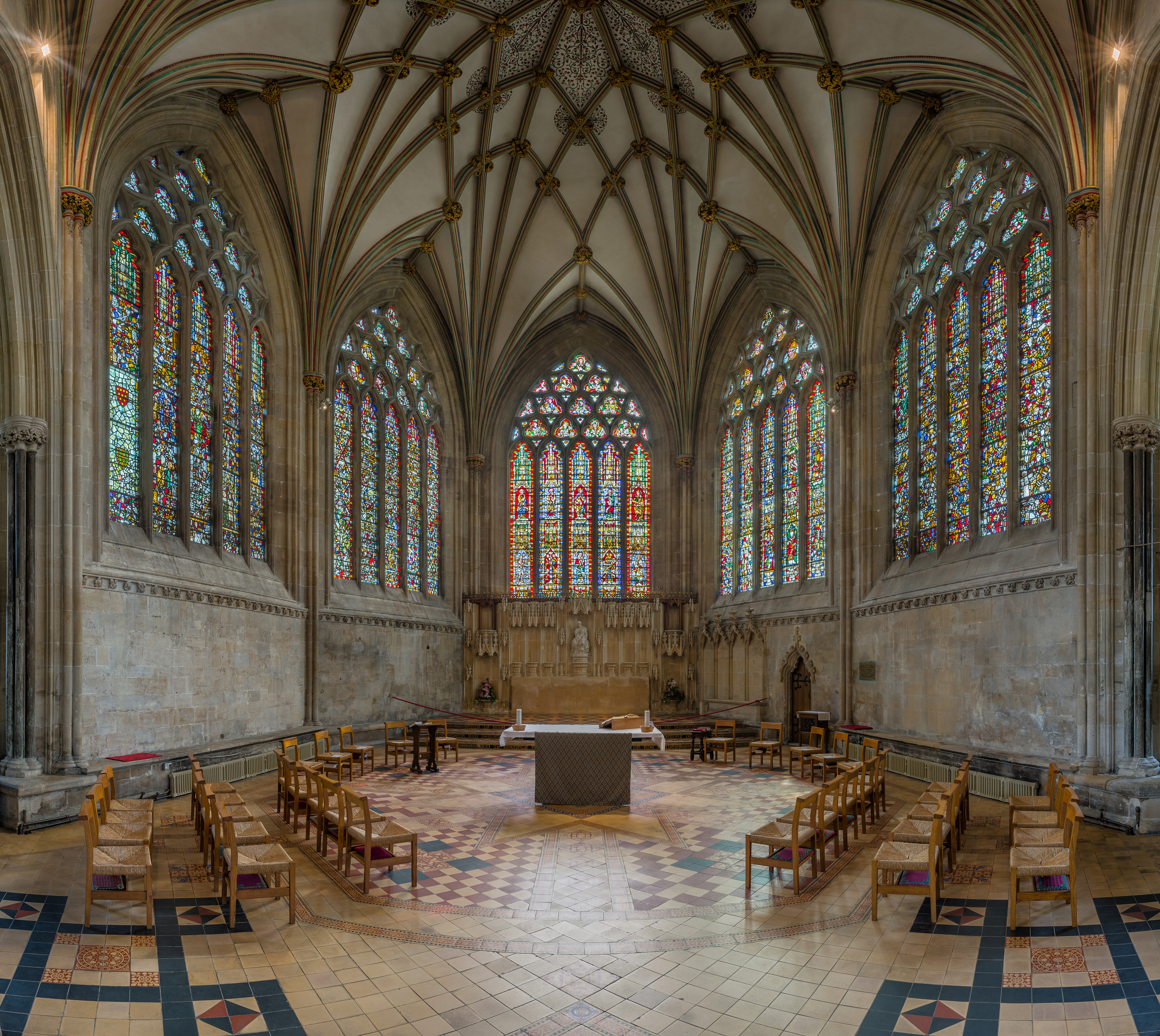
Wells Cathedral Lady chapel

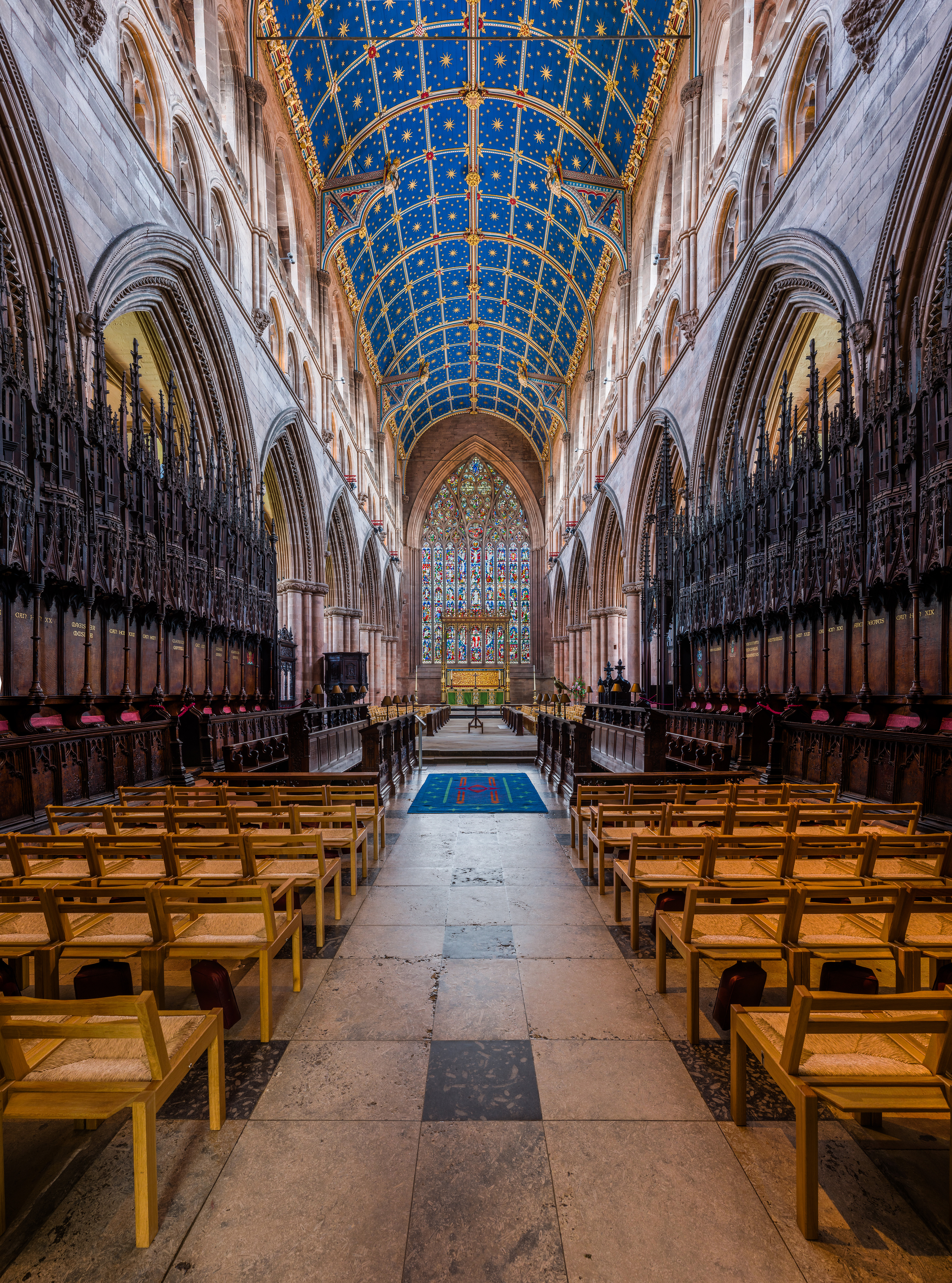
Carlisle Cathedral choir
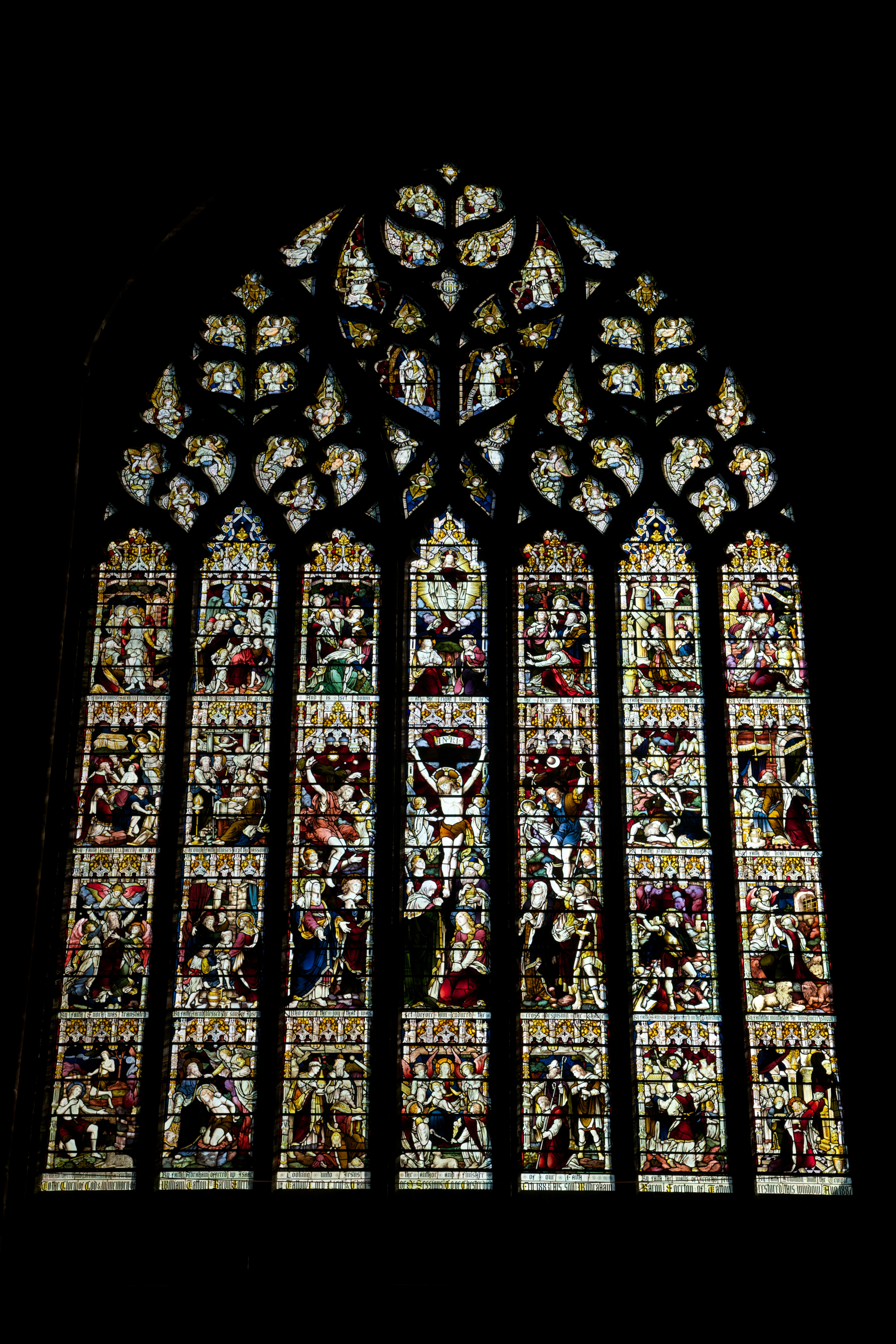
Chester Cathedral south transept window

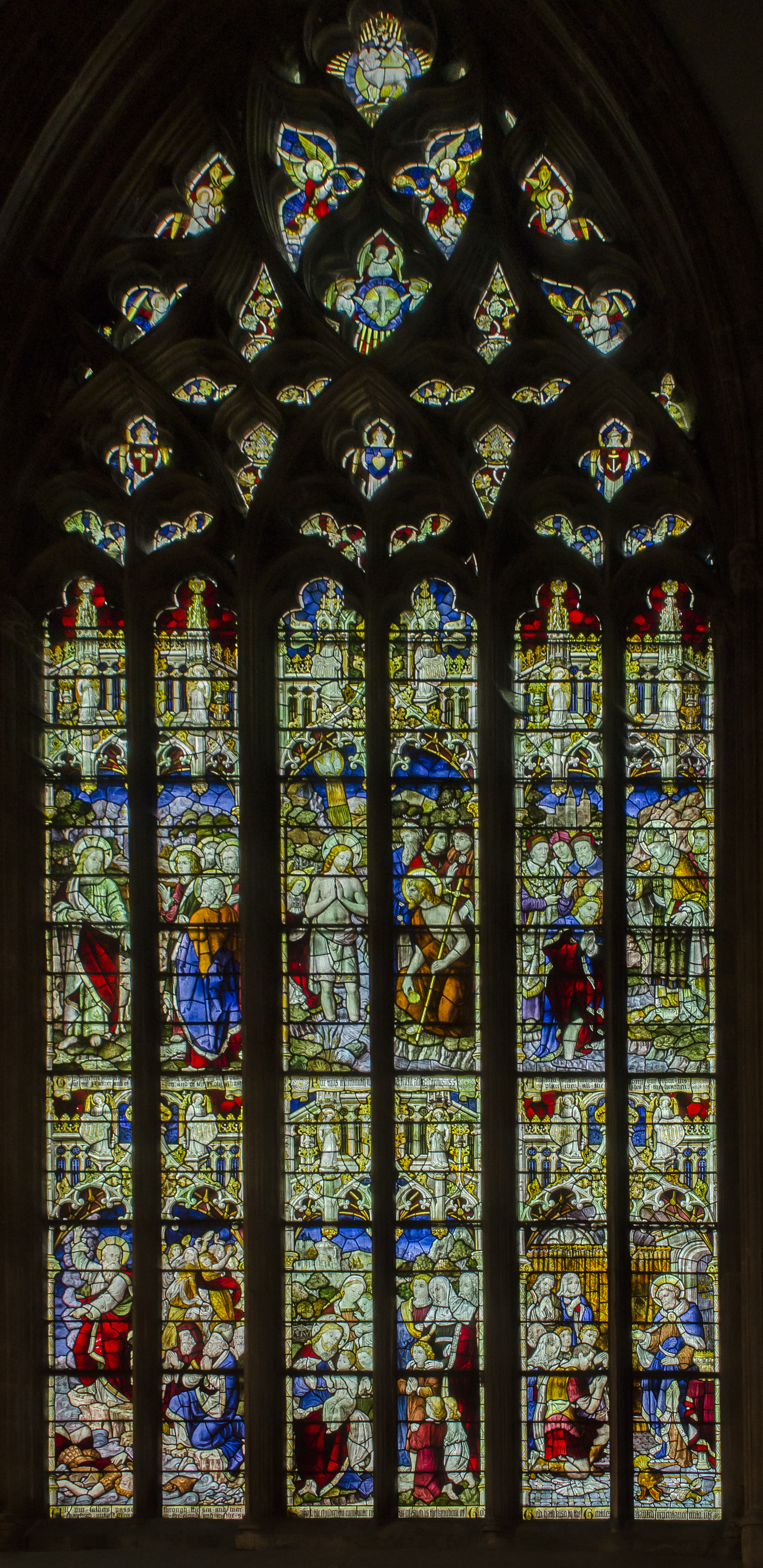
Church of St Mary Magdalene, Newark-on-Trent, south aisle west window

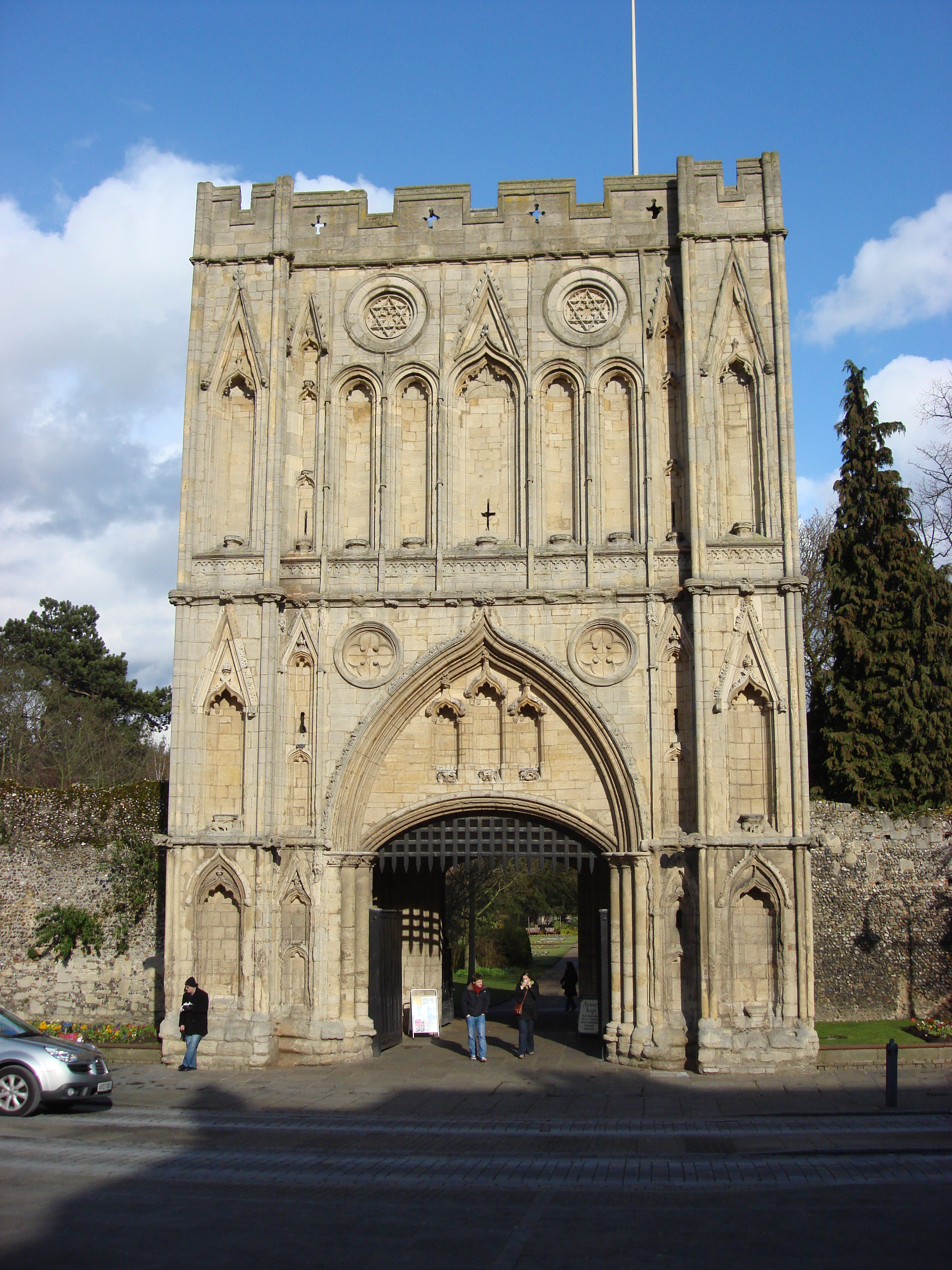
Bury St Edmunds Abbey gateway

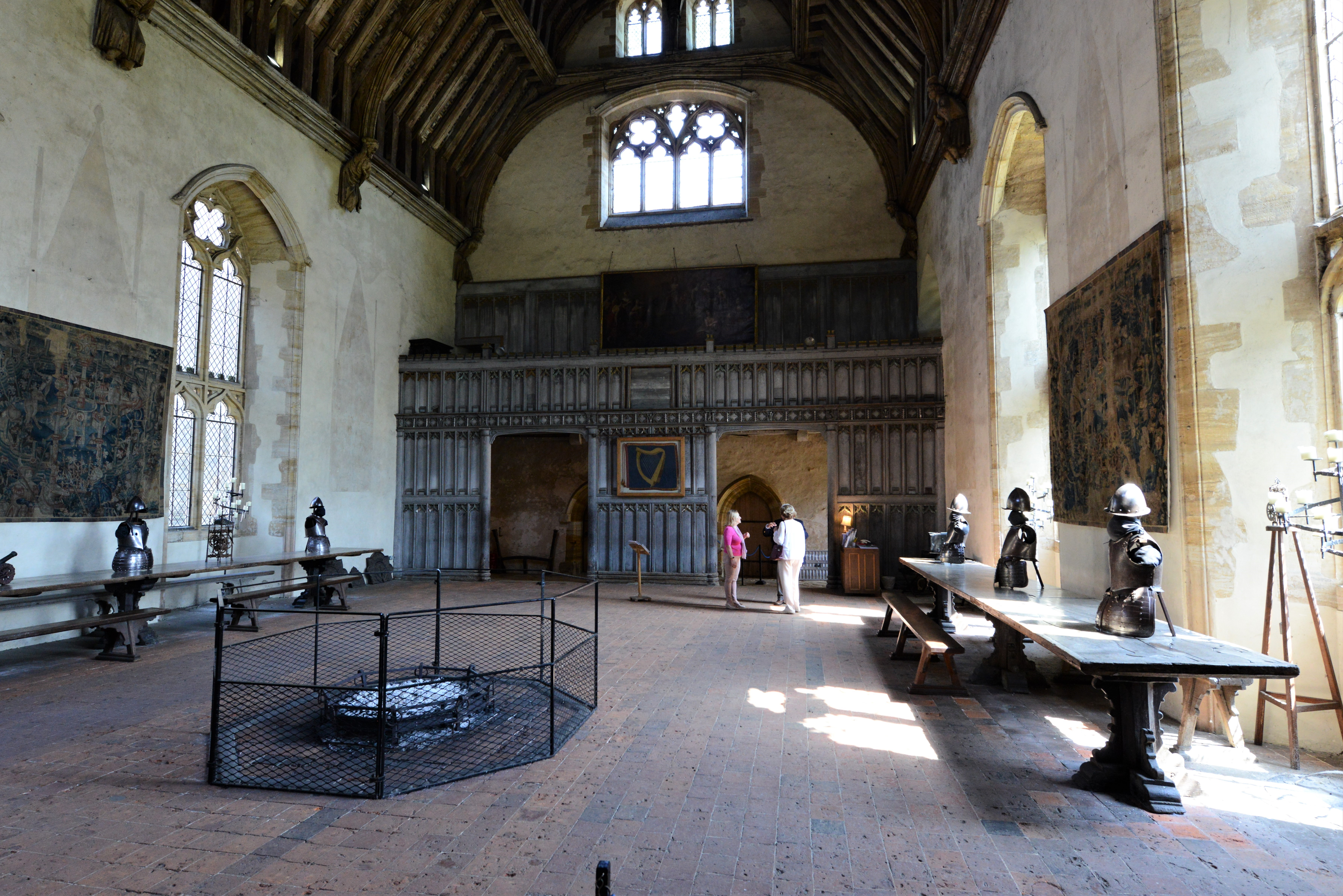
The great hall at Penshurst Place (1340s)

Additions in the Decorated style were often added to earlier cathedrals. One striking example is found at Ely Cathedral; the architect Thomas Witney built the central tower from 1315 to 1322 in Decorated style. Soon afterwards another architect, William Joy, added curving arches to strengthen the structure, and made further extensions to join the Lady Chapel to the Choir. In 1329–1345, he created an extraordinary double arch in the decorated style.

=== Characteristics ===
- Tracery. Decorated architecture is particularly characterised by the elaborate tracery within the stained glass windows. The elaborate windows are subdivided by closely spaced parallel mullions (vertical bars of stone), usually up to the level at which the arched top of the window begins. The mullions then branch out and cross, intersecting to fill the top part of the window with a mesh of elaborate patterns called tracery, typically including trefoils and quatrefoils. The style was geometrical at first and curvilinear, or curving and serpentine, in the later period, This curvilinear element was introduced in the first quarter of the 14th century and lasted about fifty years A notable example of the curvilinear style is the East window of Carlisle Cathedral, (about 1350). Another notable example of decorated curvilinear is the west window of York Minster (1338–39)
- Lierne vaulting. Vaulting became much more elaborate in this period. The rib vault of earlier Early Gothic usually had just four compartments, with a minimum number of ribs which were all connected to the columns below, and all played a role in distributing the weight and outwards and downwards. In the Decorated architecture period, additional ribs were added to the vaulted ceilings which were purely decorative. They created very elaborate star patterns and other geometric designs. Gloucester Cathedral and Ely Cathedral have notable lierne vaults from this period
- The buttress became more prominent in this period, as at Lichfield Cathedral, to allow larger traceried windows. The buttresses were often topped by ornamented stone pinnacles to give them greater weight.
- Sculpture also became more ornate and decorative. The ball flower and a four-leaved flower motif took the place of the earlier dog-tooth. The foliage in the capitals was less conventional than in Early English and more flowing, Another decorative feature of the period was diapering, or creating multi-colour geometric patterns on walls or panels made with different colours of stone or brick
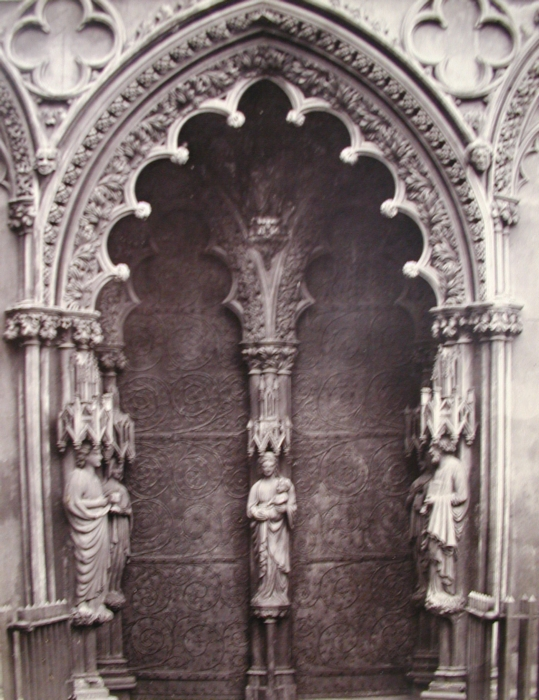
Decorated ornament on the west porch of Lichfield Cathedral (1195–1340)

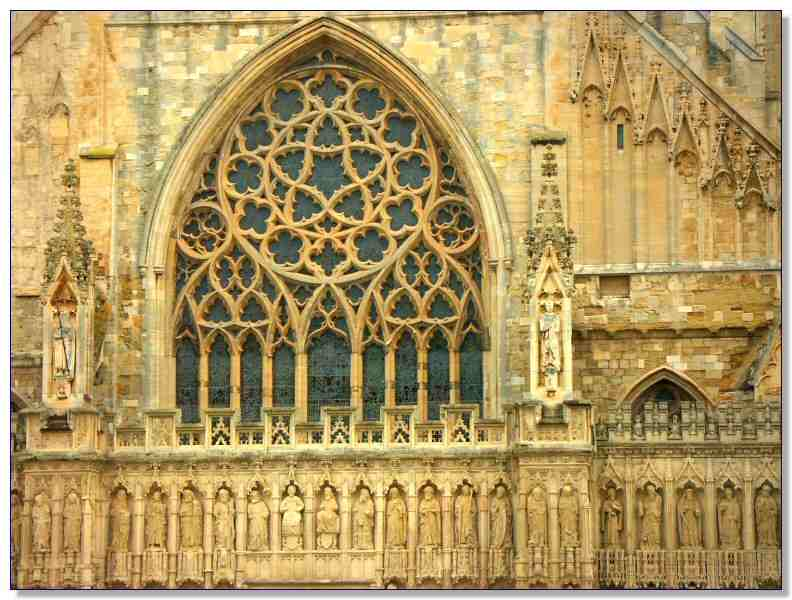
Tracery, diapering and sculptural decoration on Exeter Cathedral (1258–1400)

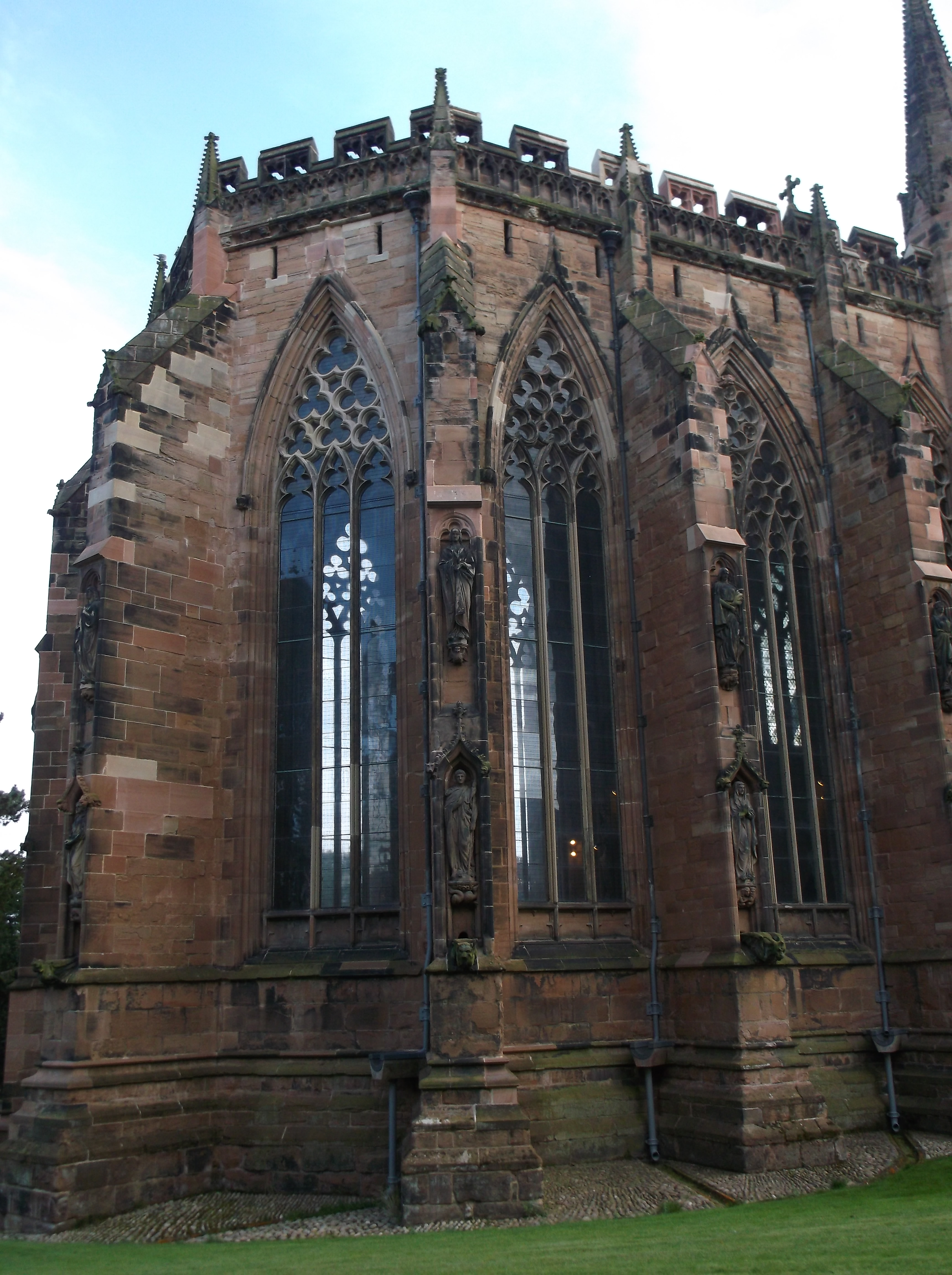
Buttresses, topped by pinnacles, at Lichfield Cathedral (1195–1340)

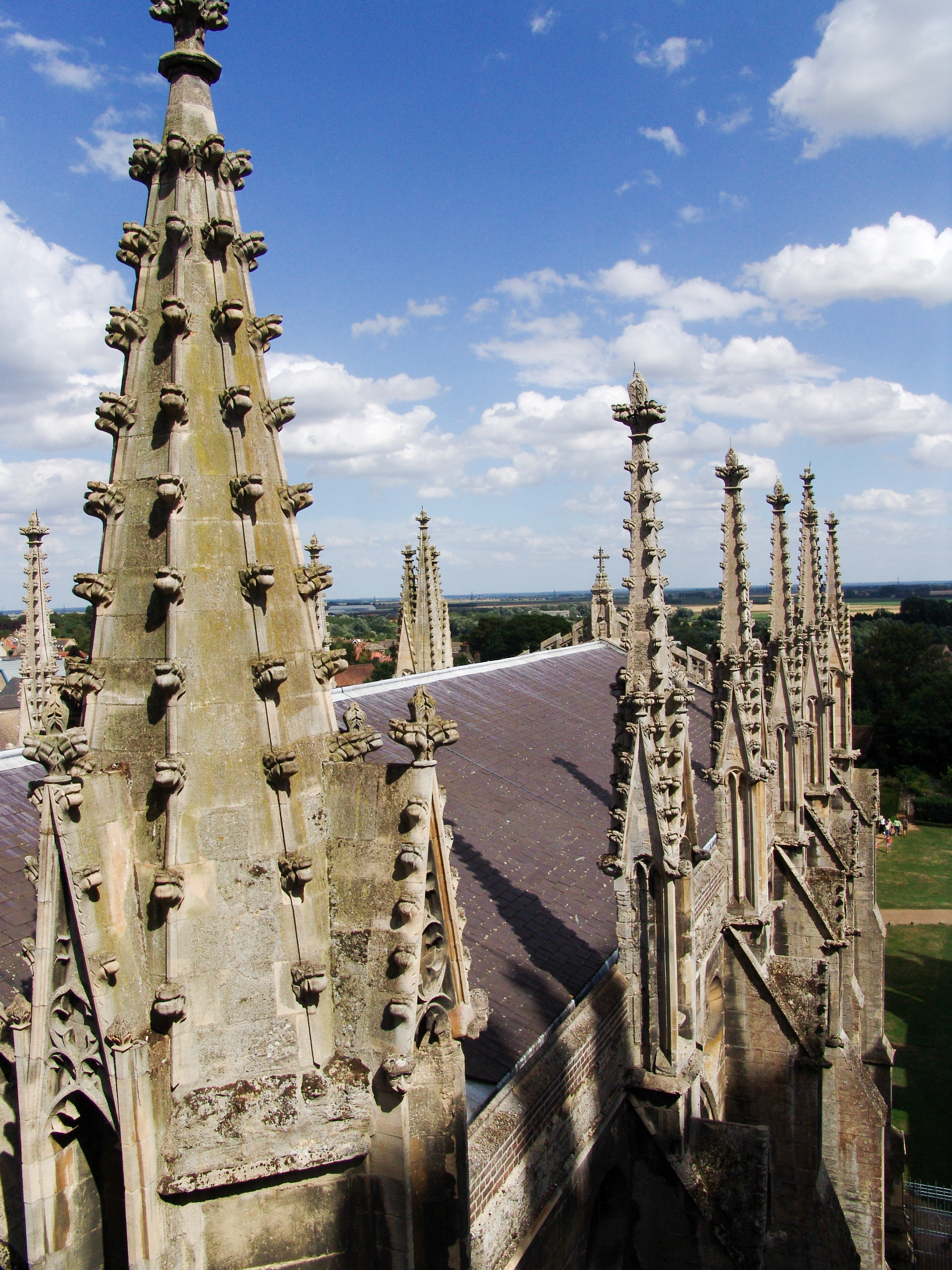
Pinnacles on the roof of Ely Cathedral (1321–1351)

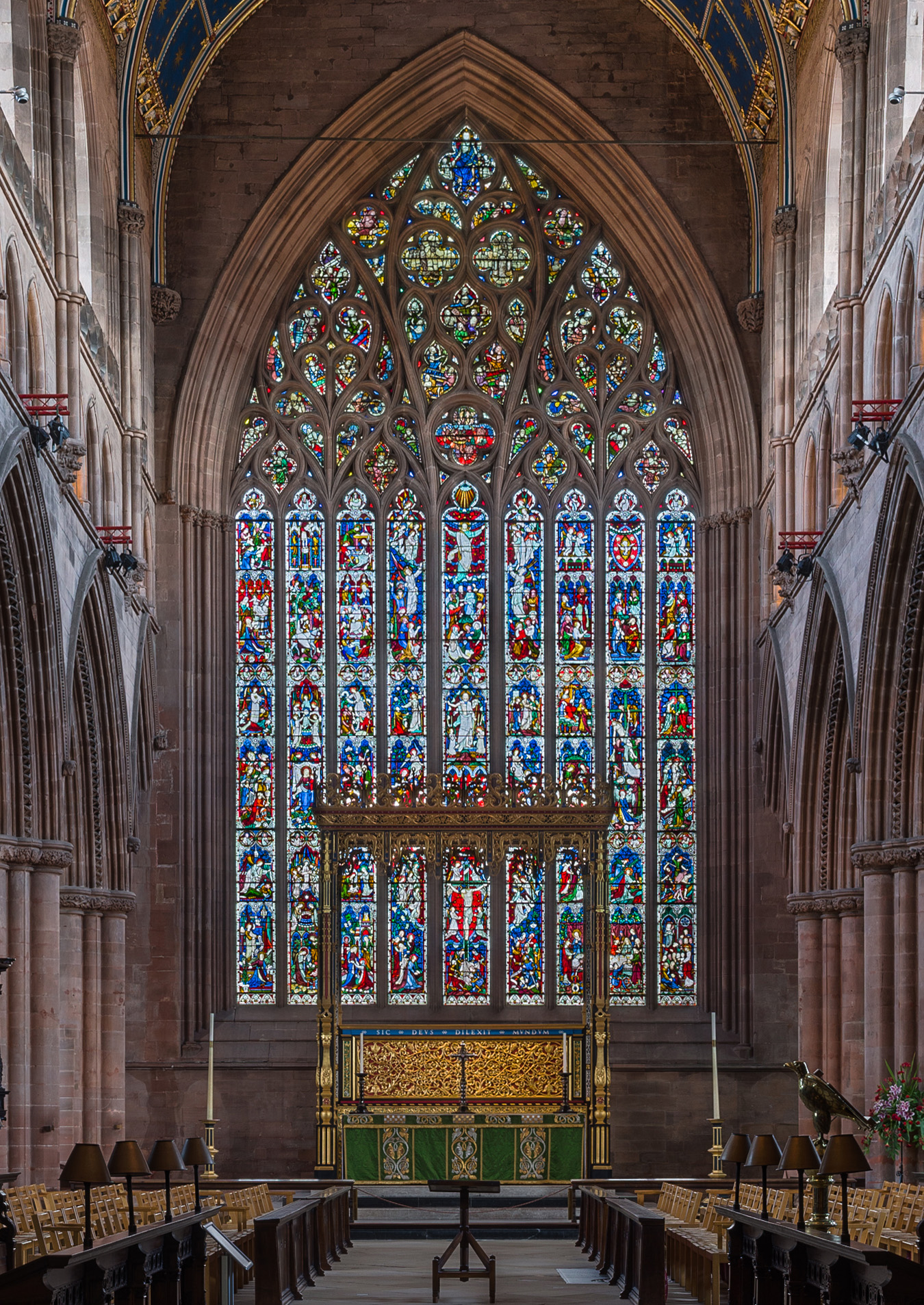
East window of Carlisle Cathedral, with curvilinear tracery (about 1350)

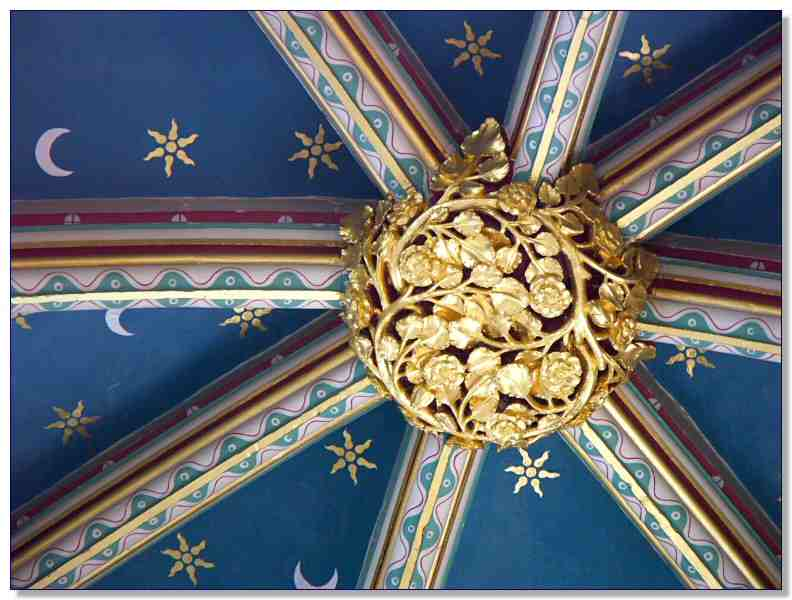
Floral boss joining the ribs of the vaults of Exeter Cathedral (1258–1400)

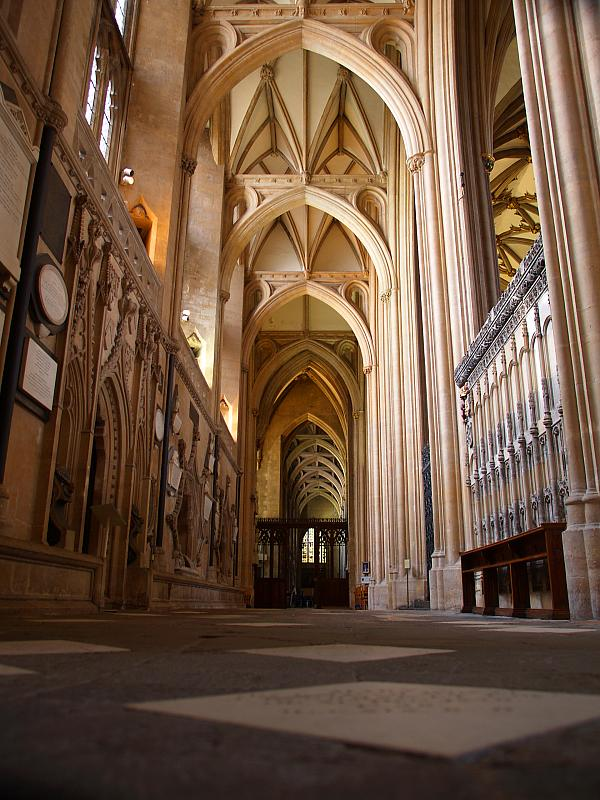
transverse arches in the aisle of Bristol Cathedral (1298–1340)

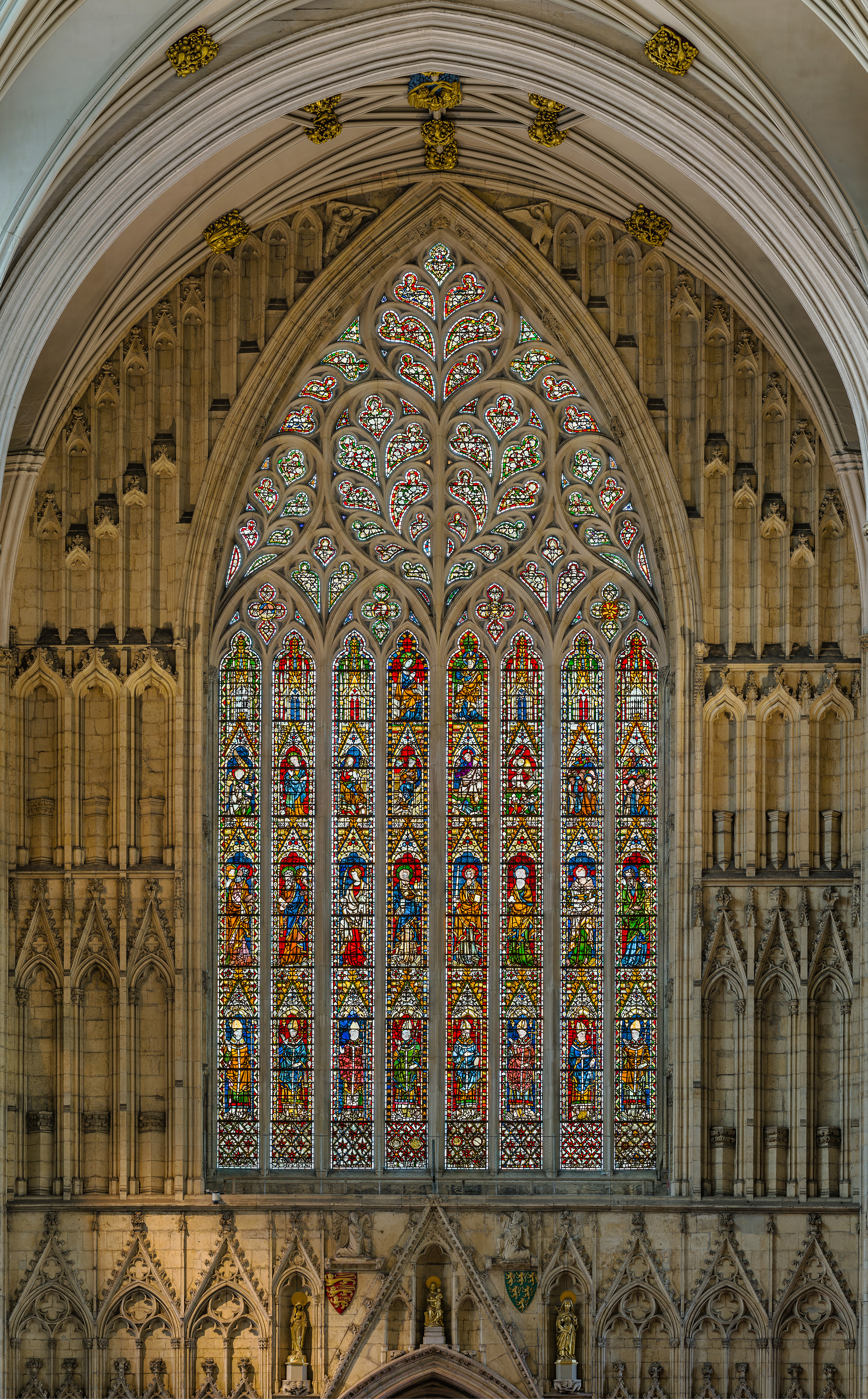
The great west window of York Minster (1338–39), featuring a motif known as the Heart of Yorkshire

=== Examples ===
- Berkeley Castle, remodelling
- East end of Bristol Cathedral (1298–1340)
- Caernarfon Castle, and Edward I's other castles in Wales, including Conwy, Harlech and Beaumaris
- Choir of Carlisle Cathedral (1292–1398; the outer walls are Early English and predate a fire in 1292)
- Denbigh Castle
- Dunstanburgh Castle (1313–22)
- at Ely Cathedral; the Lady chapel (1321–49; east window, 1371–74) and the Octagon and choir (1322–62), as well as Prior Crauden's Chapel
- all of Exeter Cathedral except for the Norman transeptal towers (1270s-1375)
- St Wulfram's Church, Grantham (1280–1350)
- St Andrew's Church, Heckington
- at Hereford Cathedral; north transept (transitional; 1245–1268) and central tower (1300–1310)
- Hull Minster, brick eastern parts
- Knaresborough Castle; the great tower
- at Lichfield Cathedral; the nave and west front (1265–93), central tower (c. 1300) and Lady Chapel (1320–36)
- at Lincoln Cathedral; the Angel Choir and east end (1256–1280), cloisters (c. 1295), central tower (1307–1311), and upper part of the south transept, including the Bishop's Eye window (c. 1320–1330)
- Markenfield Hall
- Merton College chapel, Oxford (1289–96; tower and ante-chapel added 1424–50)
- St Patrick's Church, Patrington
- Penshurst Place (1340s)
- Ripon Cathedral, presbytery
- Lady chapel at St. Albans Cathedral (1308–26)
- at Salisbury Cathedral; the chapter house and cloisters (1275–85), and central tower and spire (1334–80)
- at Southwell Minster; the chapter house (1293–1300), and pulpitum (1320–35)
- Stokesay Castle (1280s-90s)
- Sweetheart Abbey, Scotland
- Tintern Abbey, church
- the nave and Guesten Hall at Worcester Cathedral (1317–95)
- Westminster Abbey (better considered a variant of French Classic Gothic and Rayonnant; 1245–1272, east end, transept and chapter house; 1376–1400, nave)
- at Wells Cathedral; the chapter house (c.1275–1310), east end (1310–19, Lady chapel; 1329–45, choir and retro-choir), central tower (1315–22), strainer arches (1338) and bishop's palace
- at York Minster; the chapter house (1260–96), nave and west front, including the Heart of Yorkshire window (1291–1375)

== Perpendicular Gothic (mid-14th to mid-16th century) ==
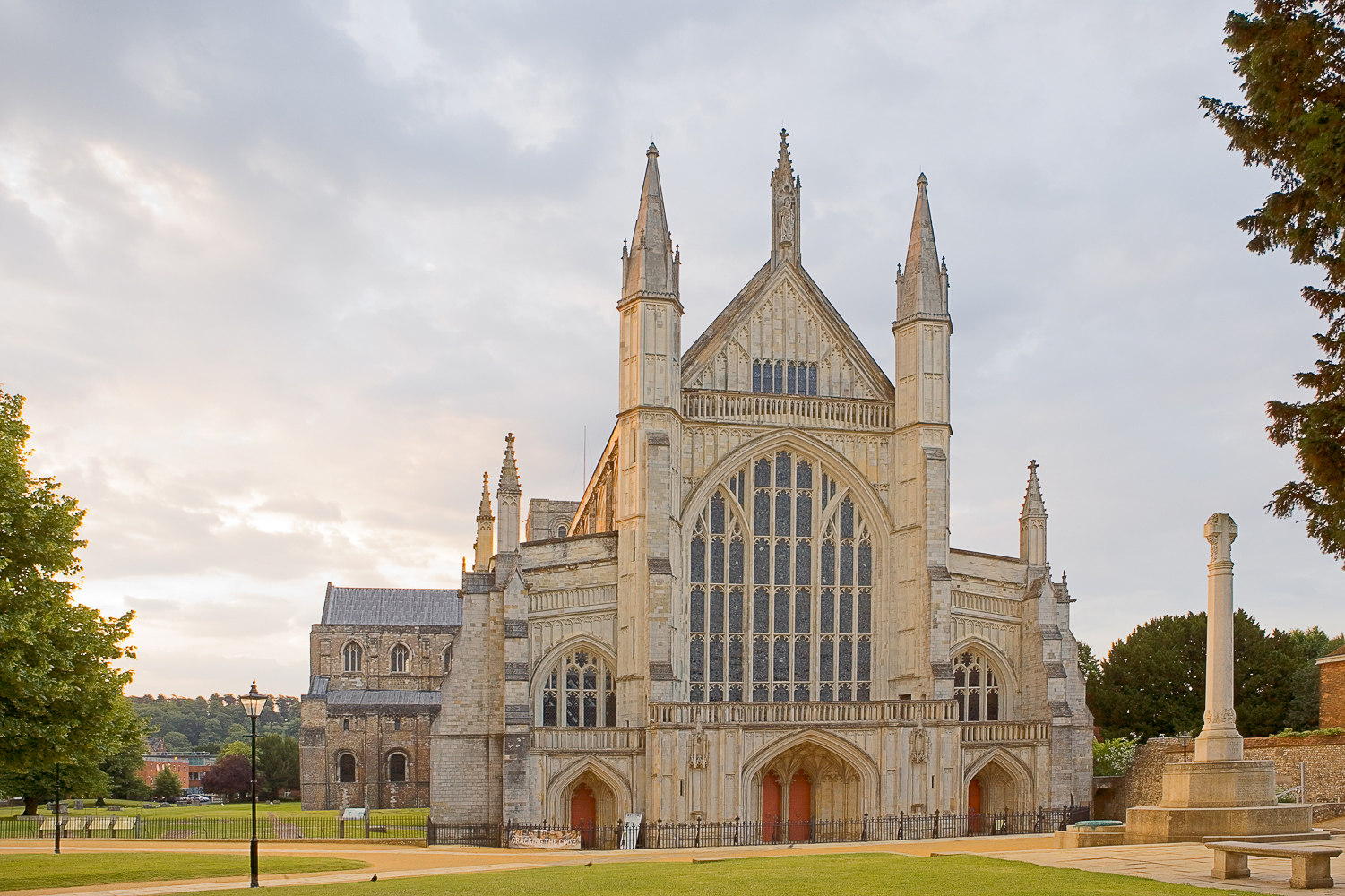
Winchester Cathedral west front

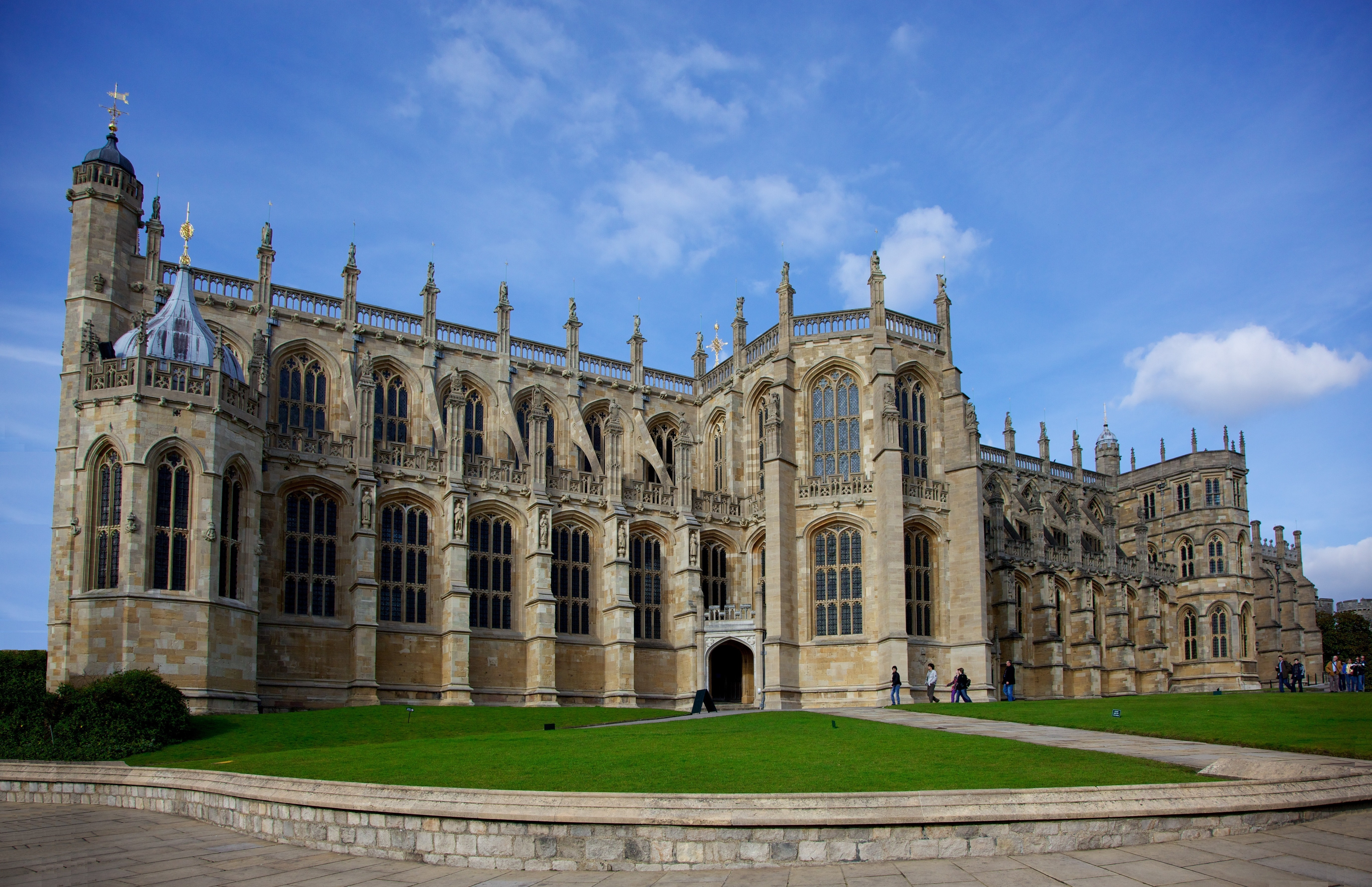
St George's Chapel, Windsor Castle (1475–)

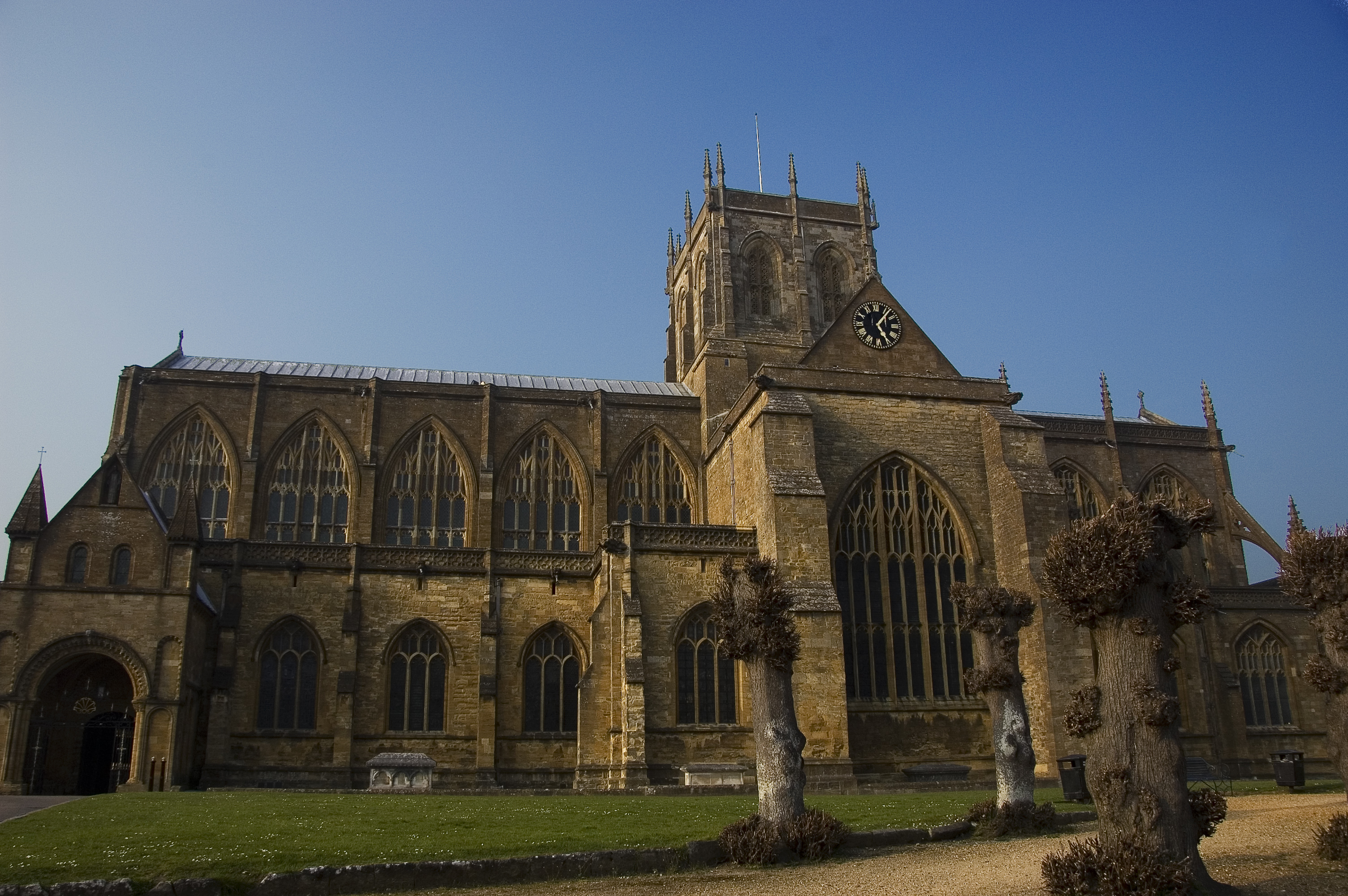
Sherborne Abbey, Dorset

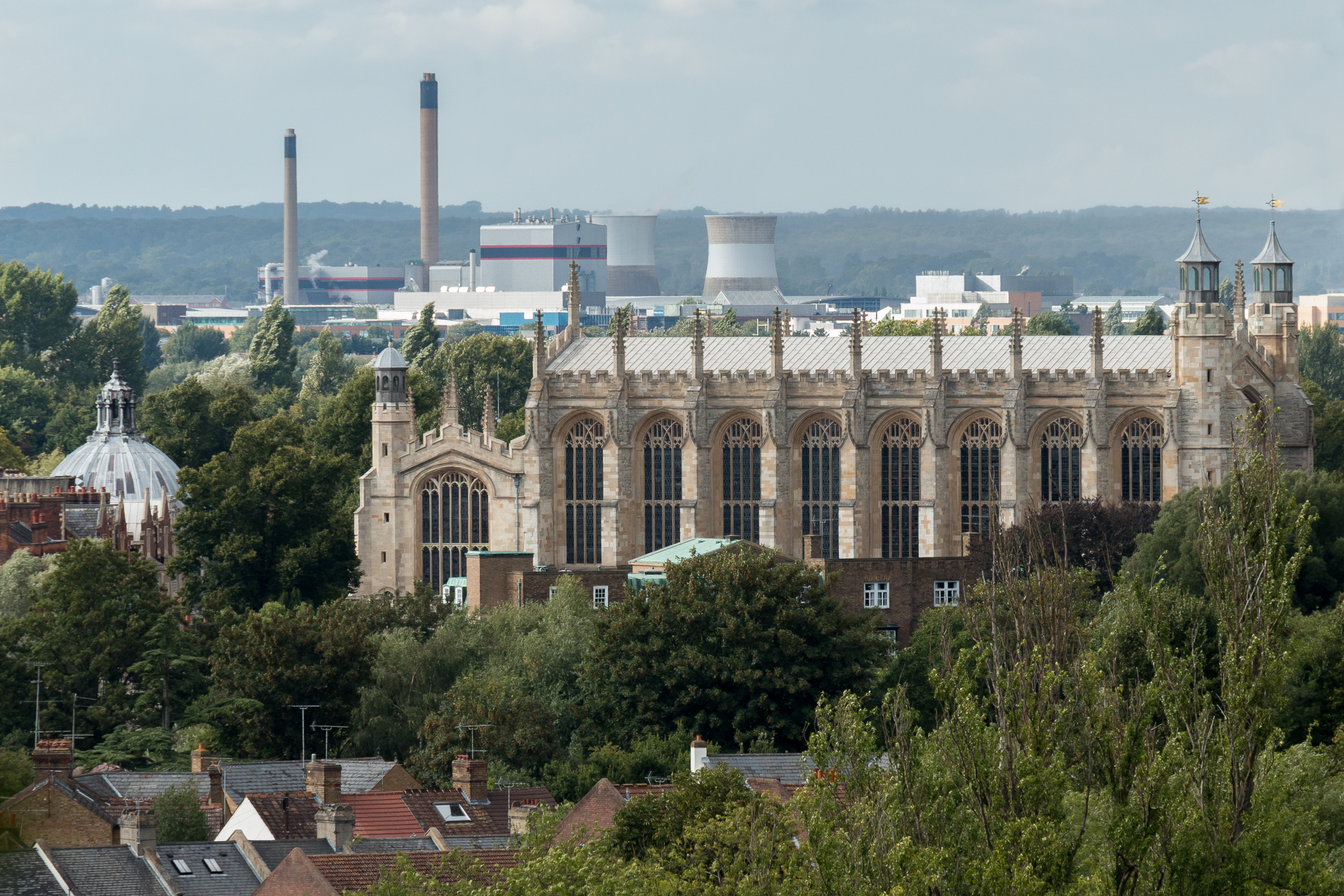
Eton College Chapel

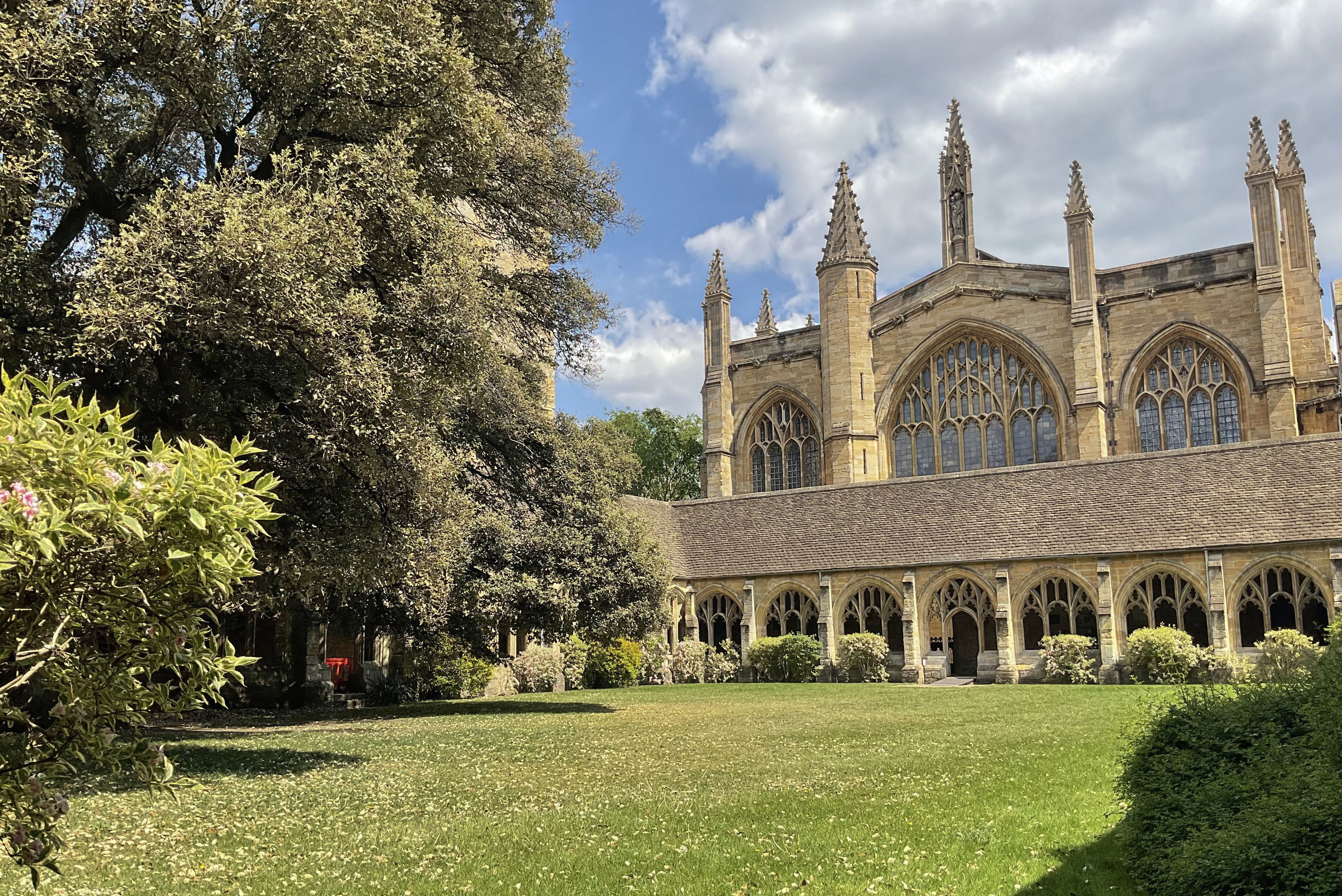
New College Chapel, Oxford

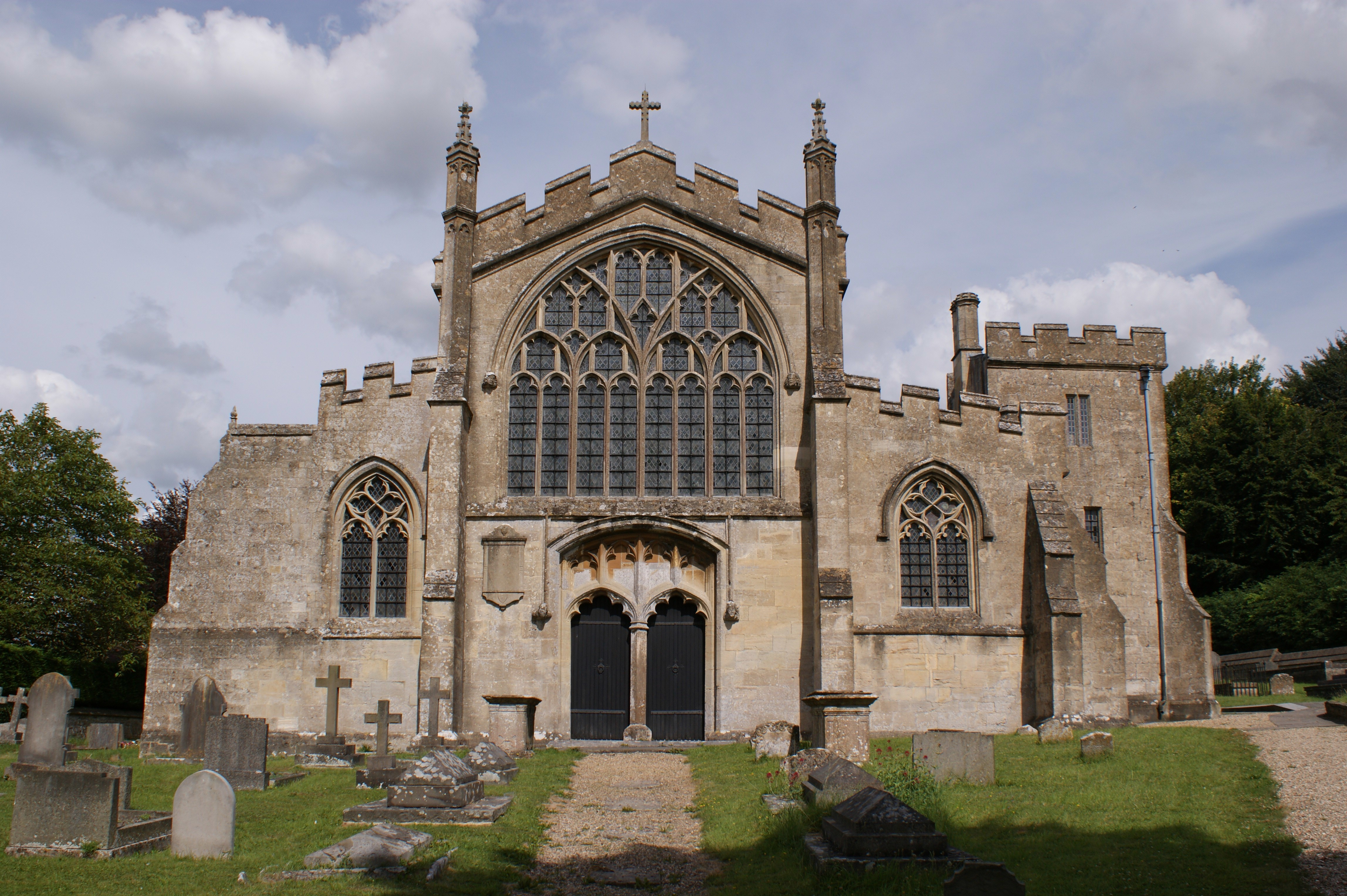
Edington Priory, Wiltshire, west front: Decorated and Perpendicular

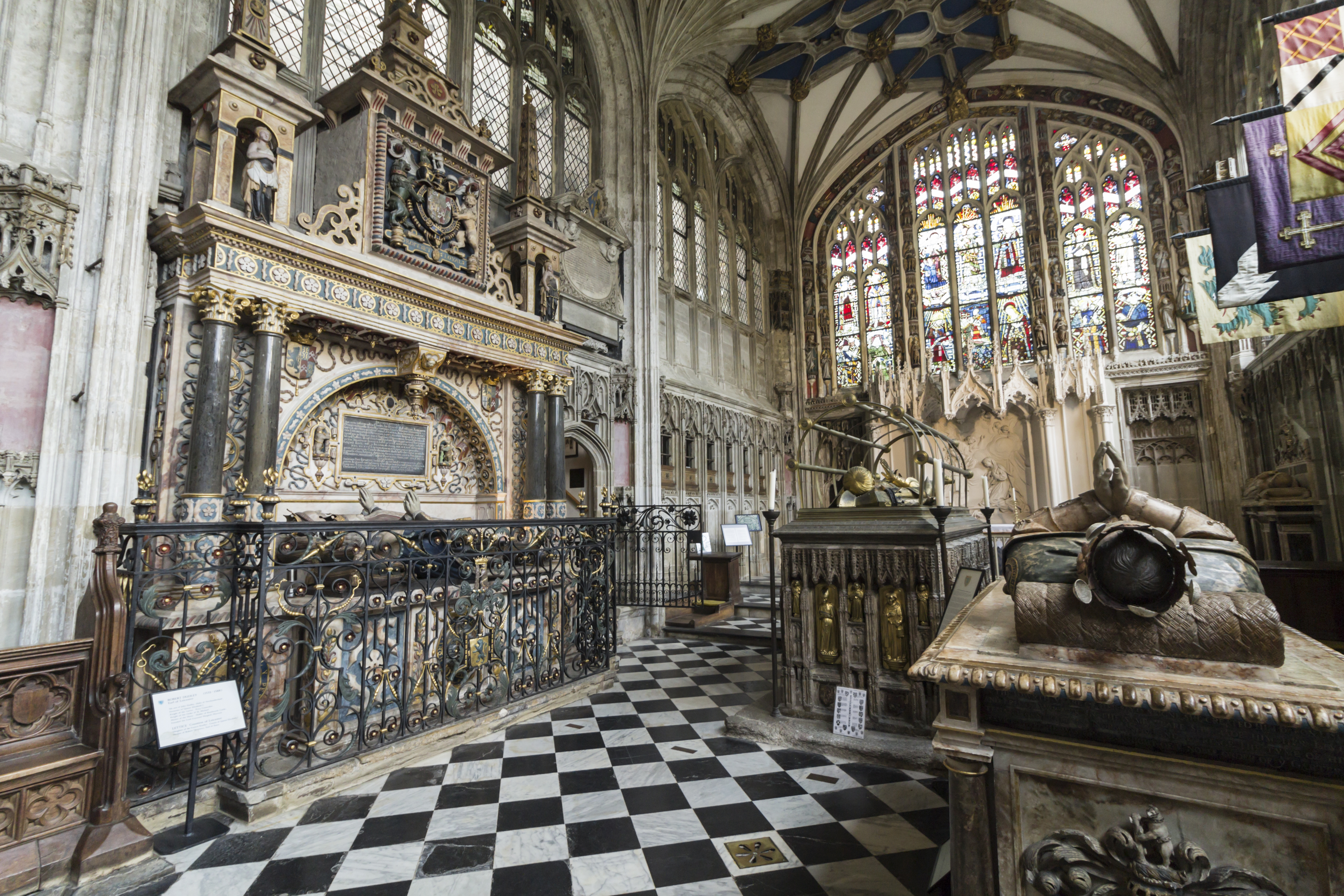
Beauchamp Chapel, Collegiate Church of St Mary, Warwick

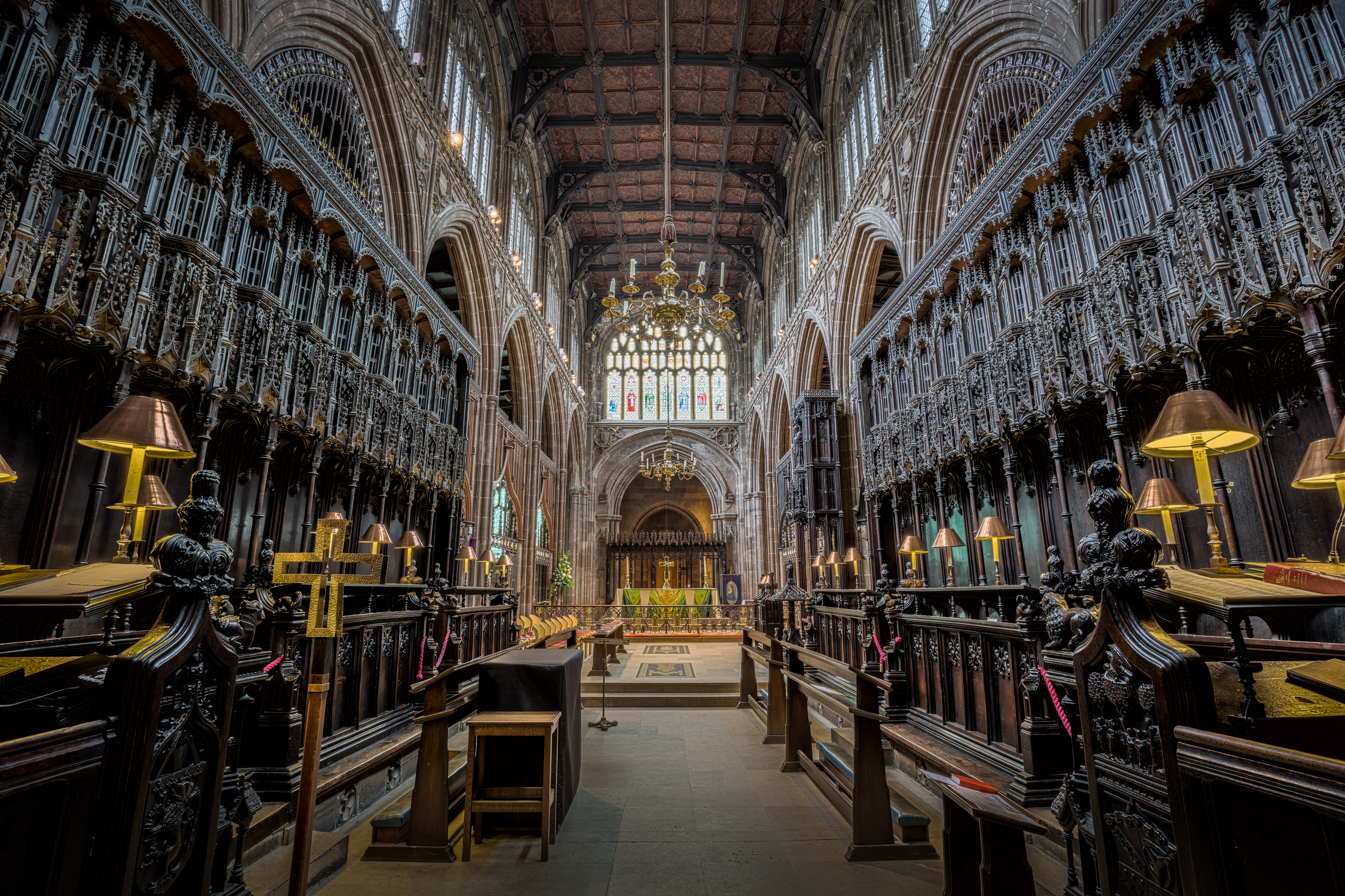
Manchester Cathedral chancel

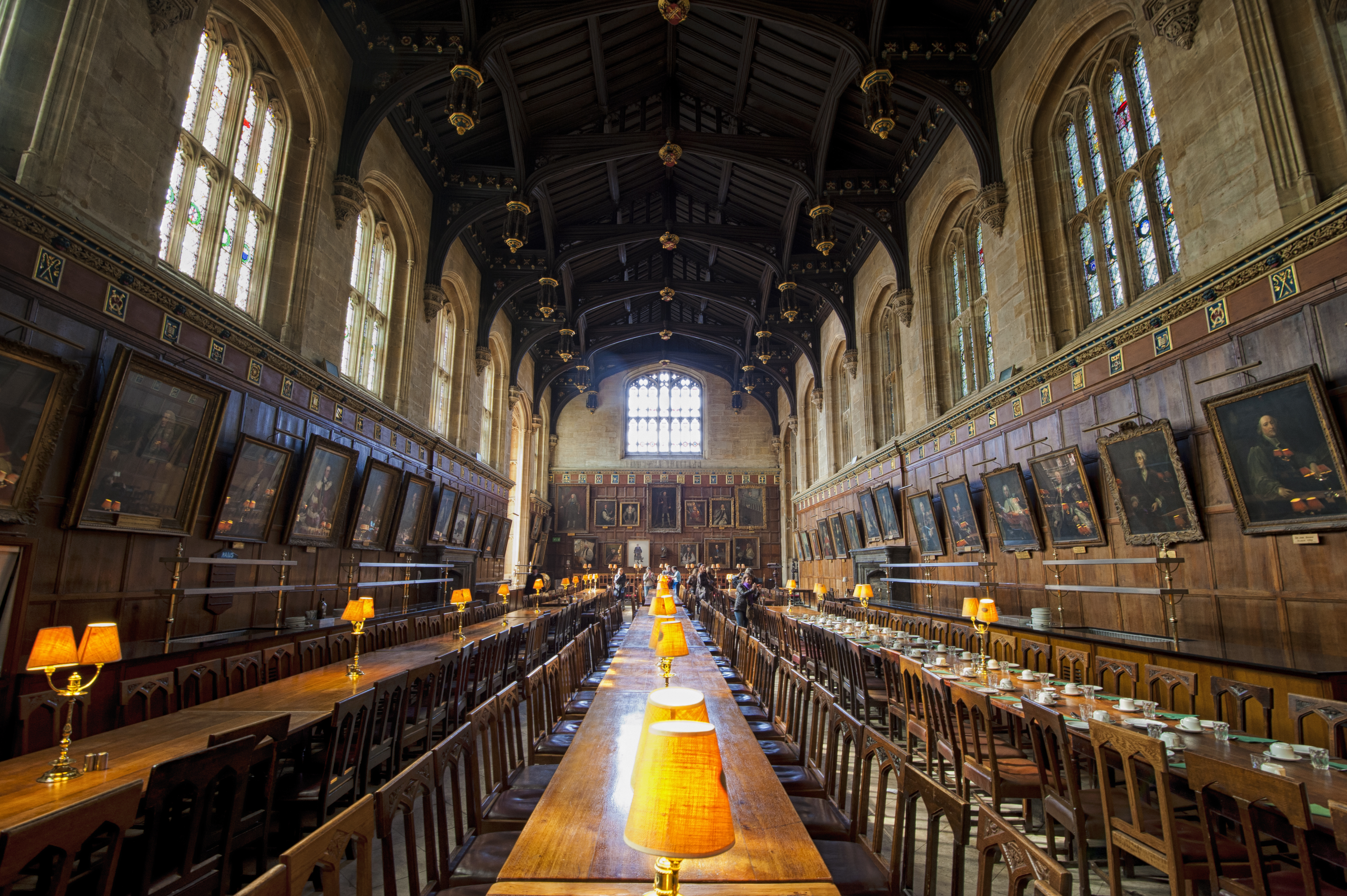
Hall of Christ Church, Oxford

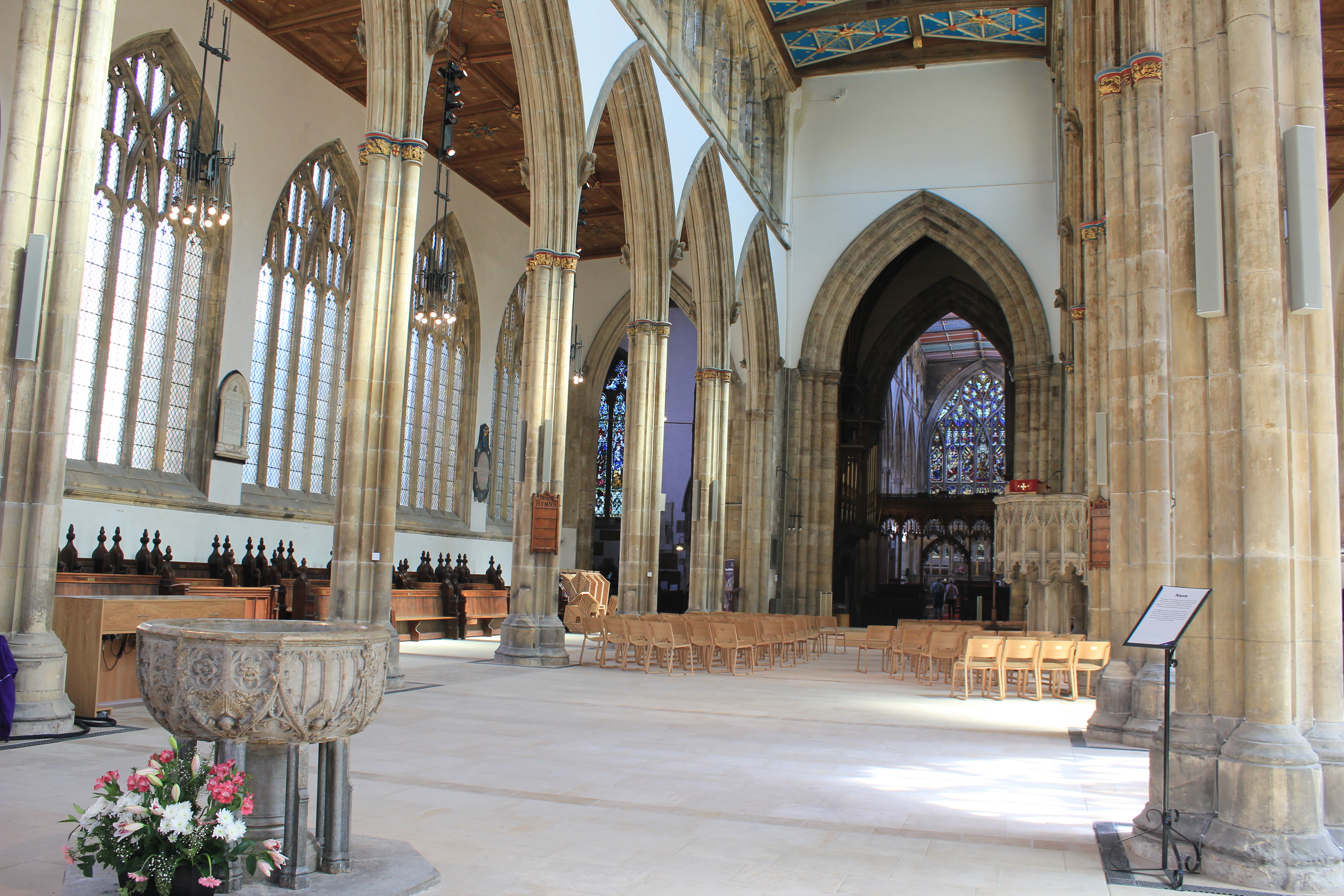
Hull Minster nave

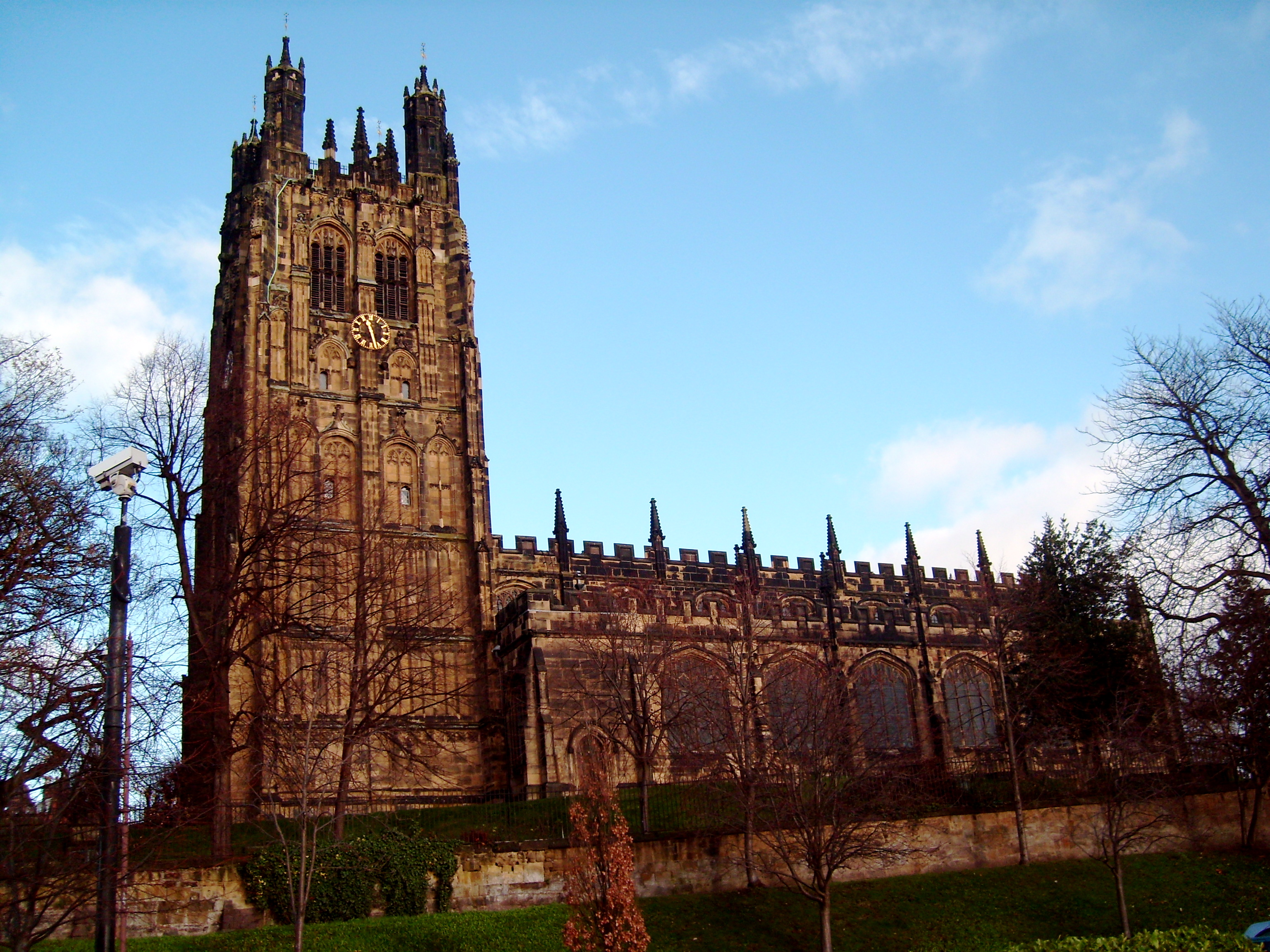
St Giles' Church, Wrexham

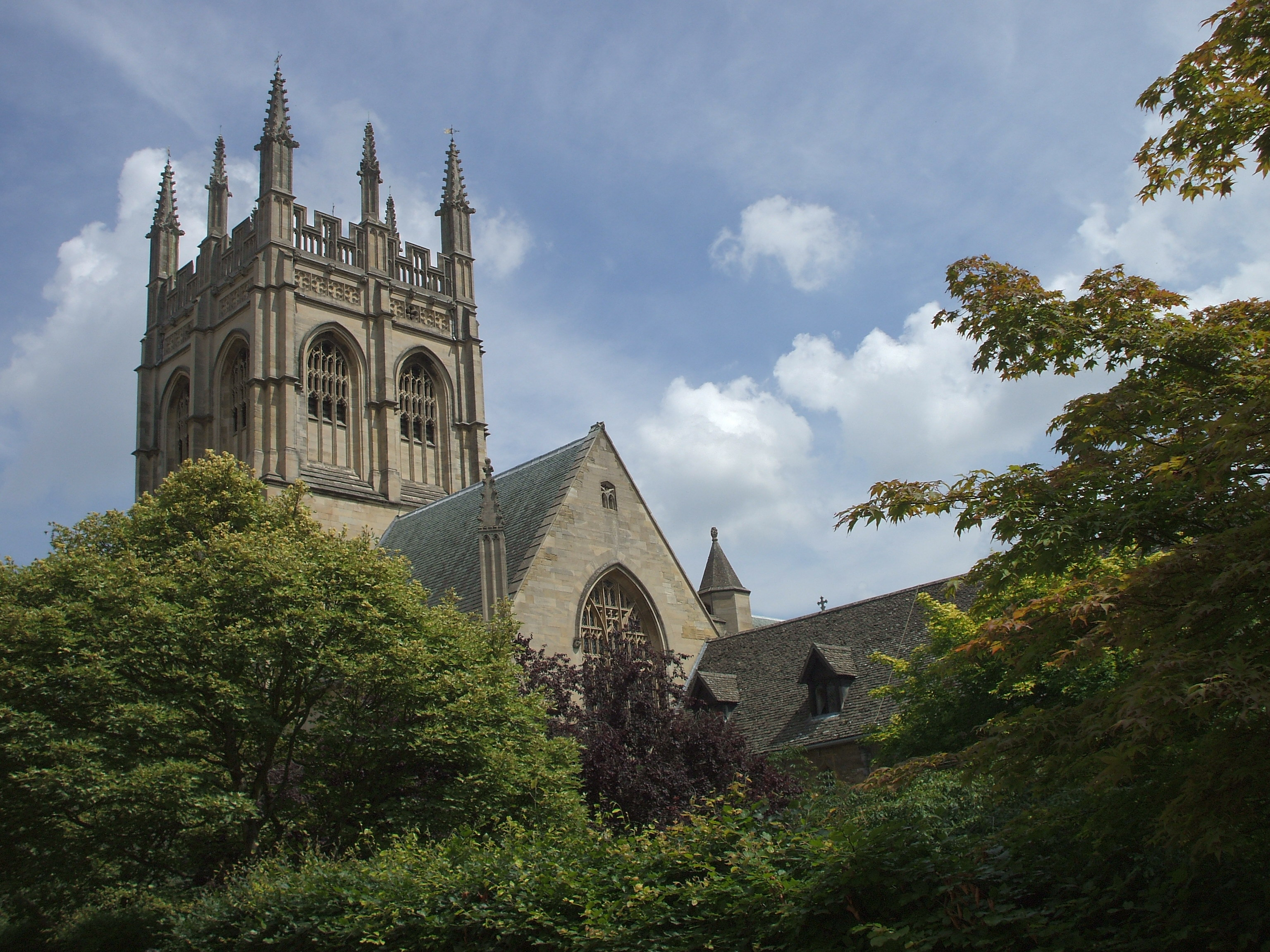
Merton College Chapel tower

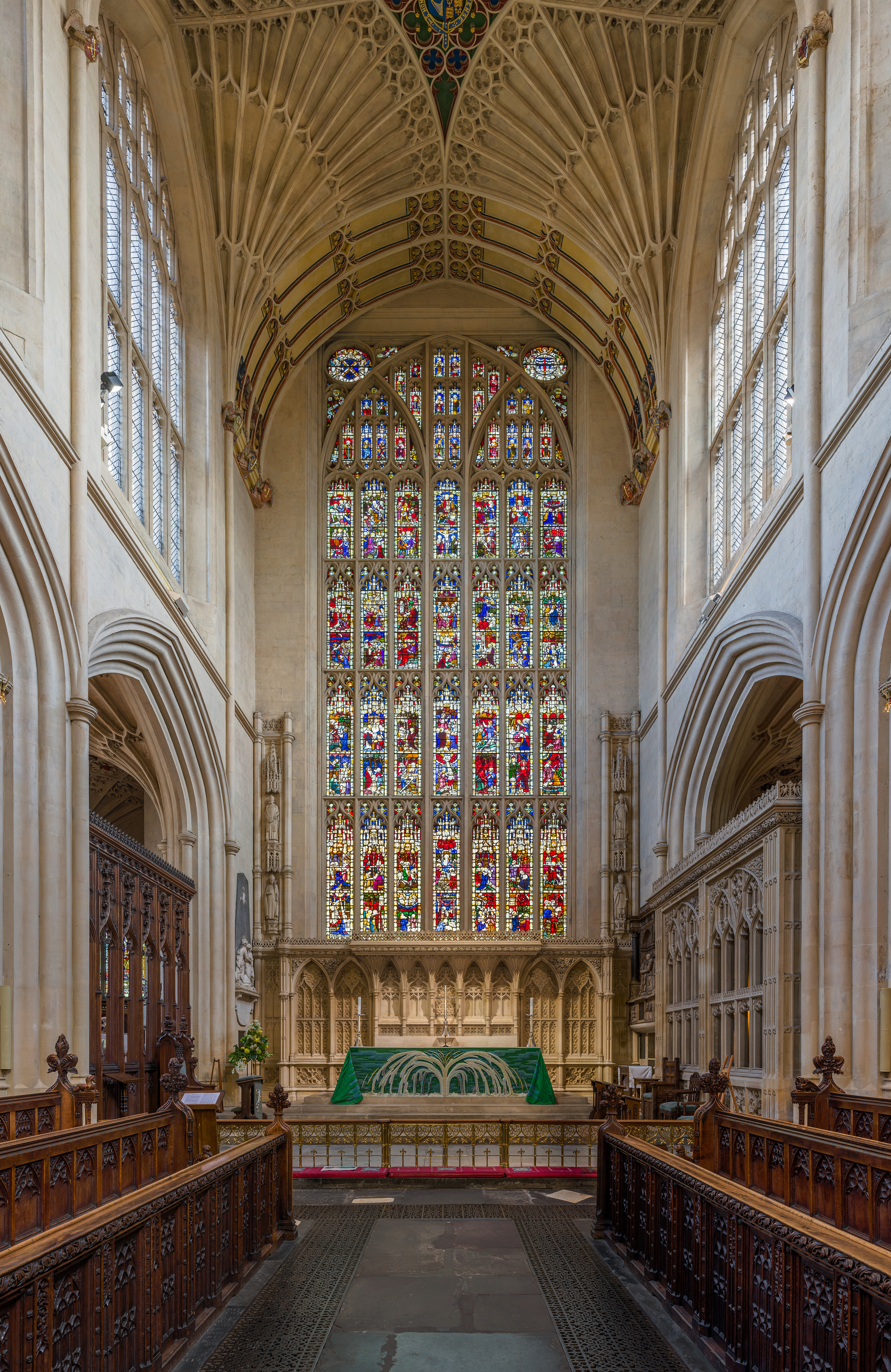
Bath Abbey chancel

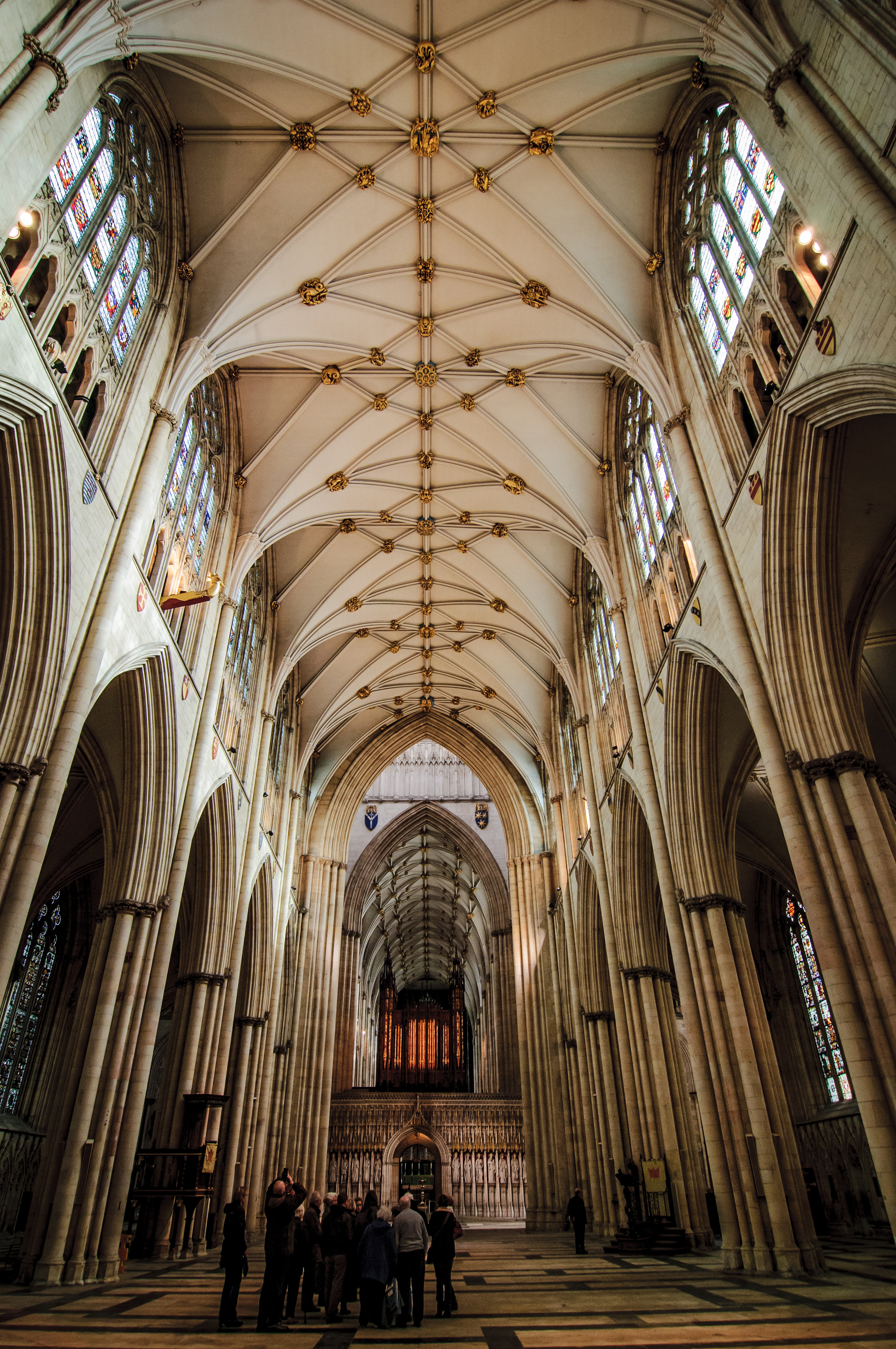
York Minster chancel, looking west

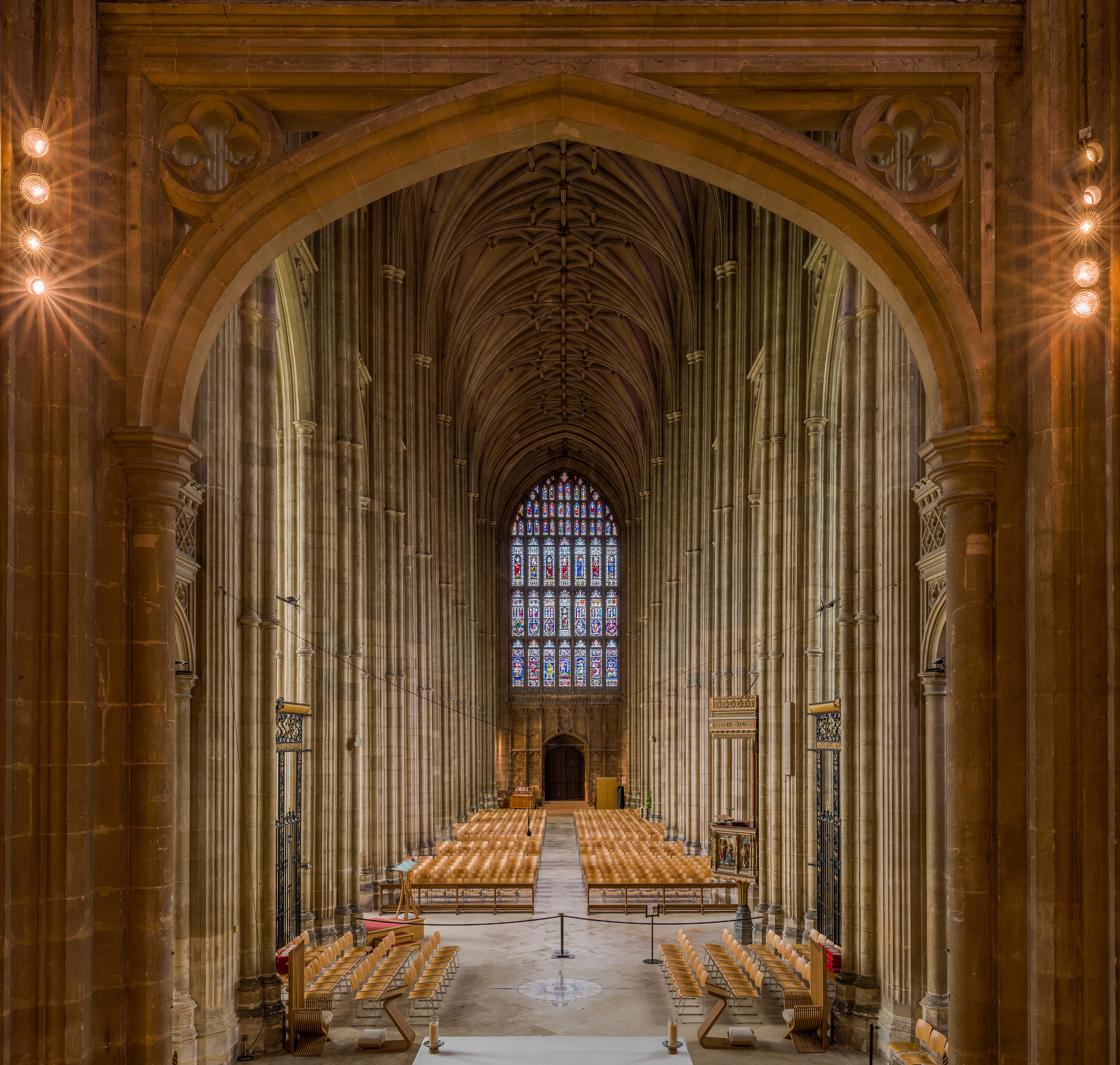
Canterbury Cathedral nave
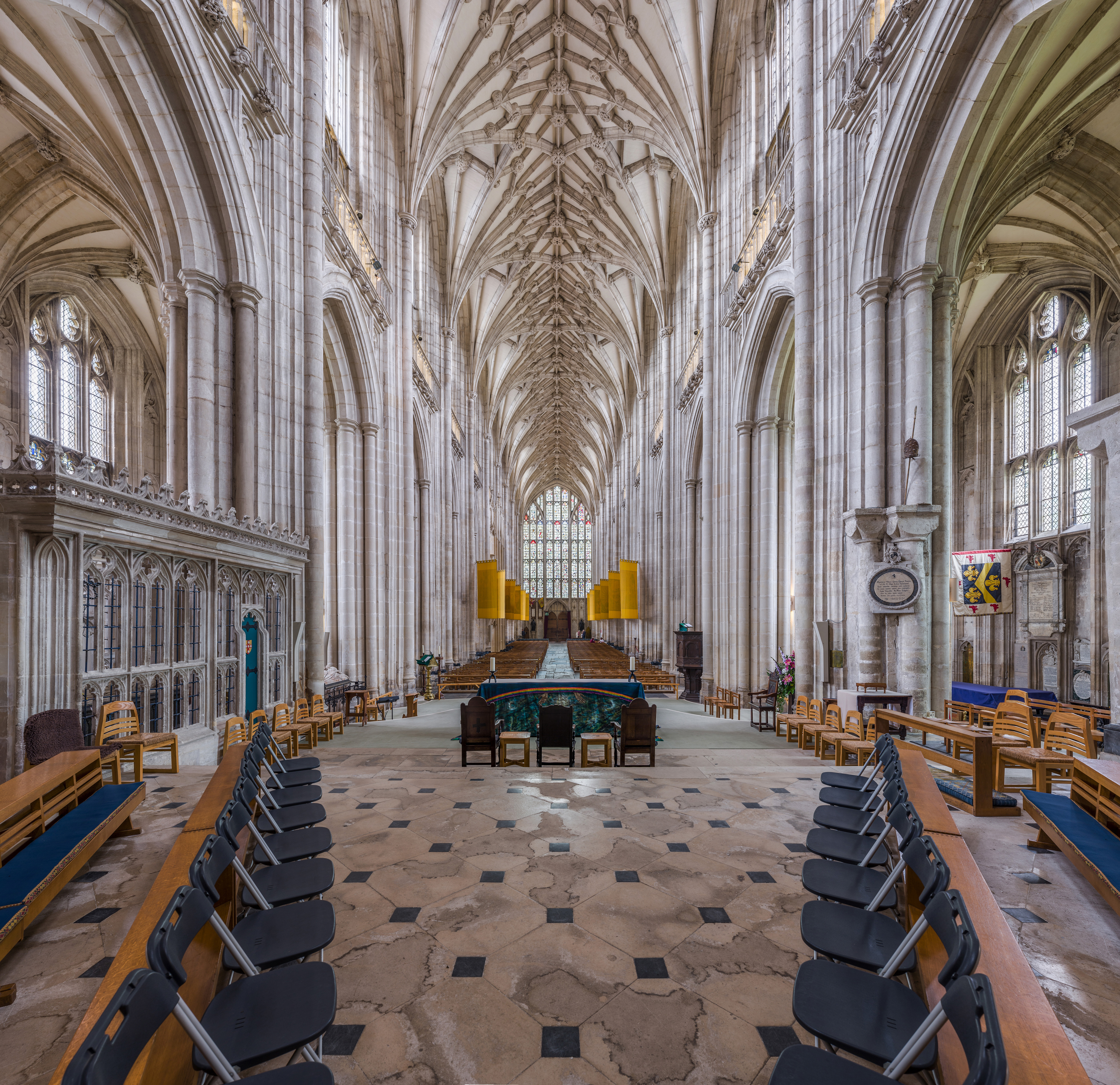
Winchester Cathedral nave

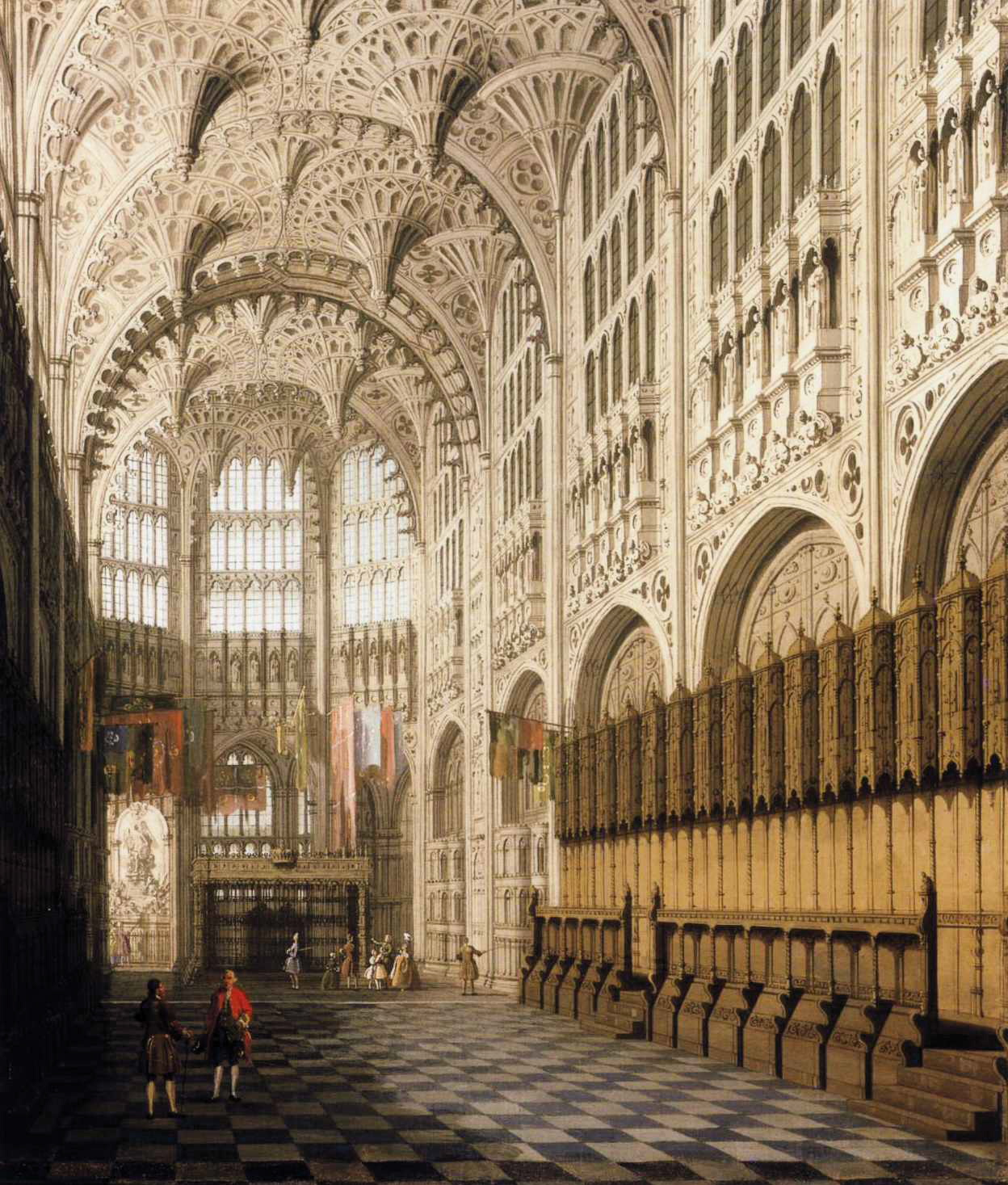
The Henry VII Chapel at Westminster Abbey (1503–) painted by Canaletto

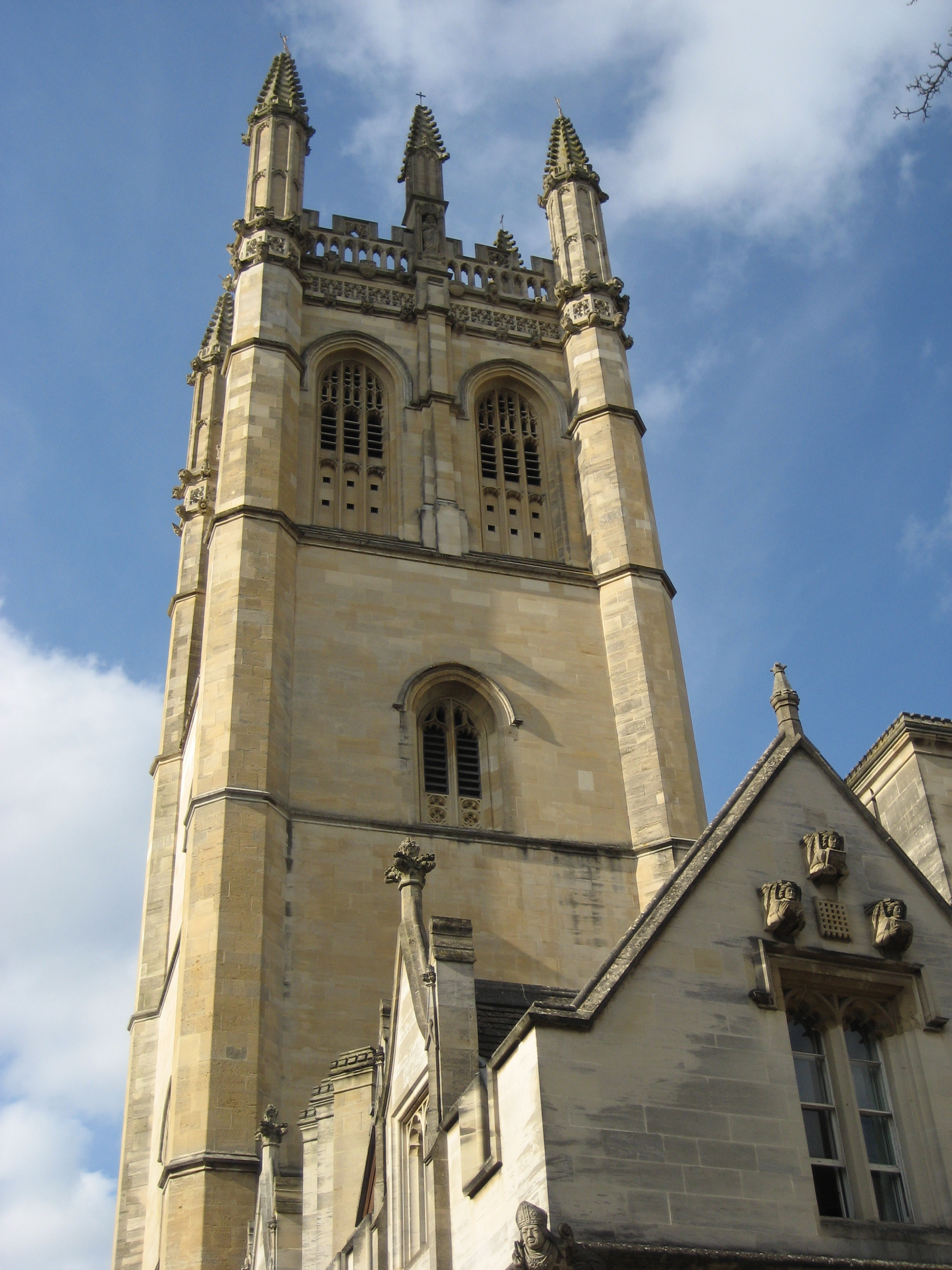
Magdalen Tower, Oxford

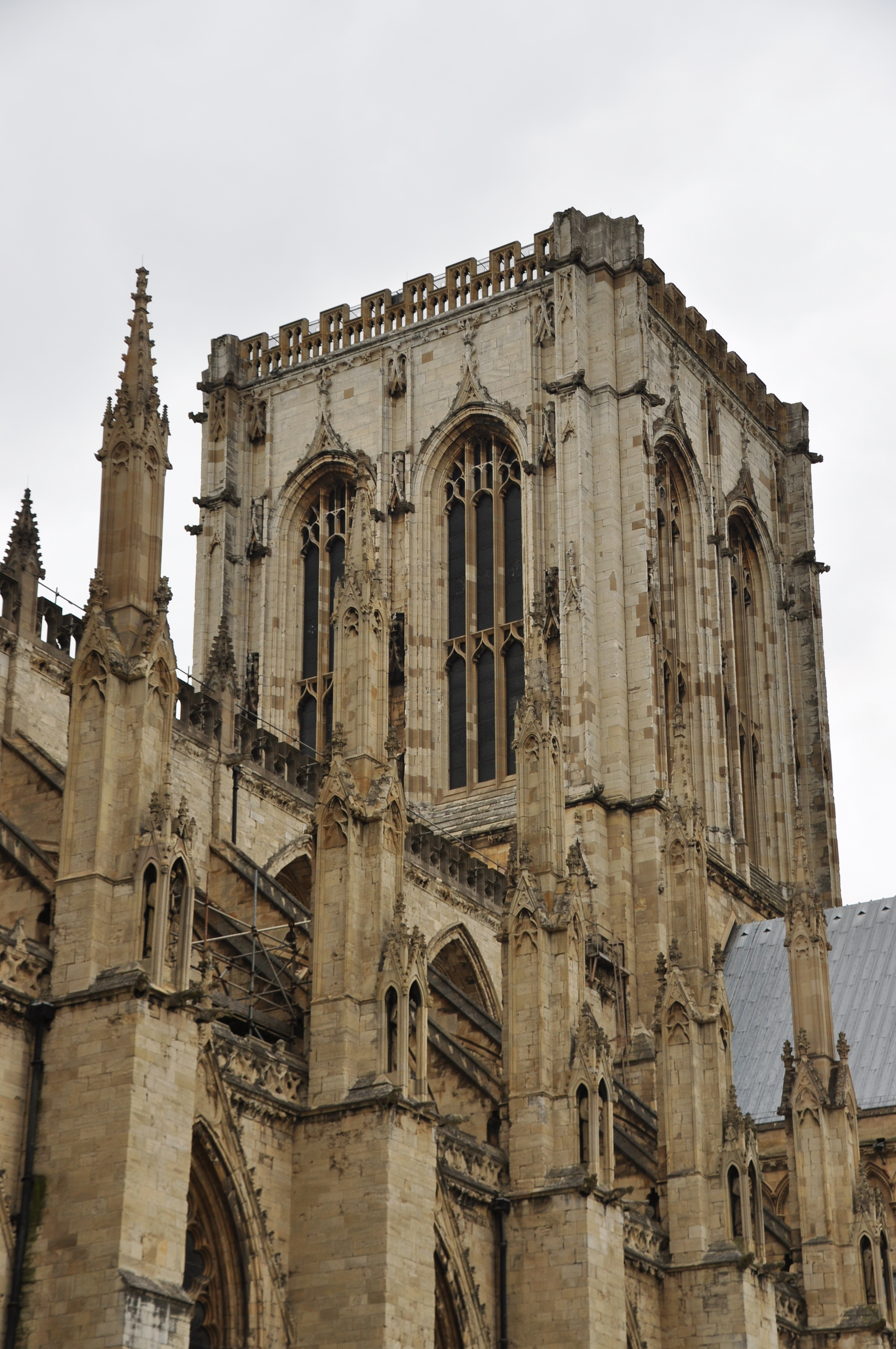
York Minster crossing tower

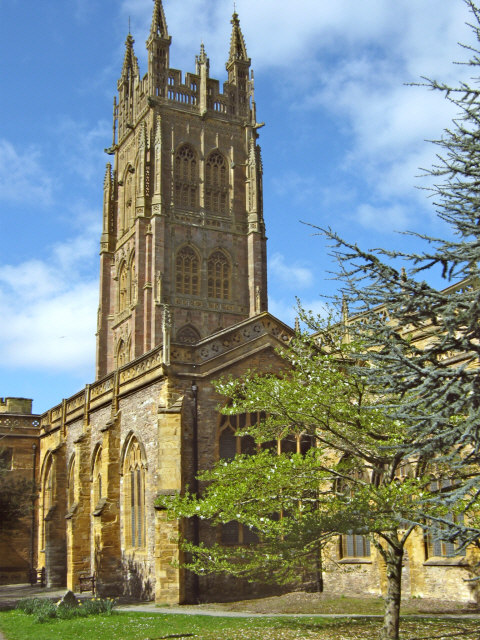
St Mary Magdalene, Taunton

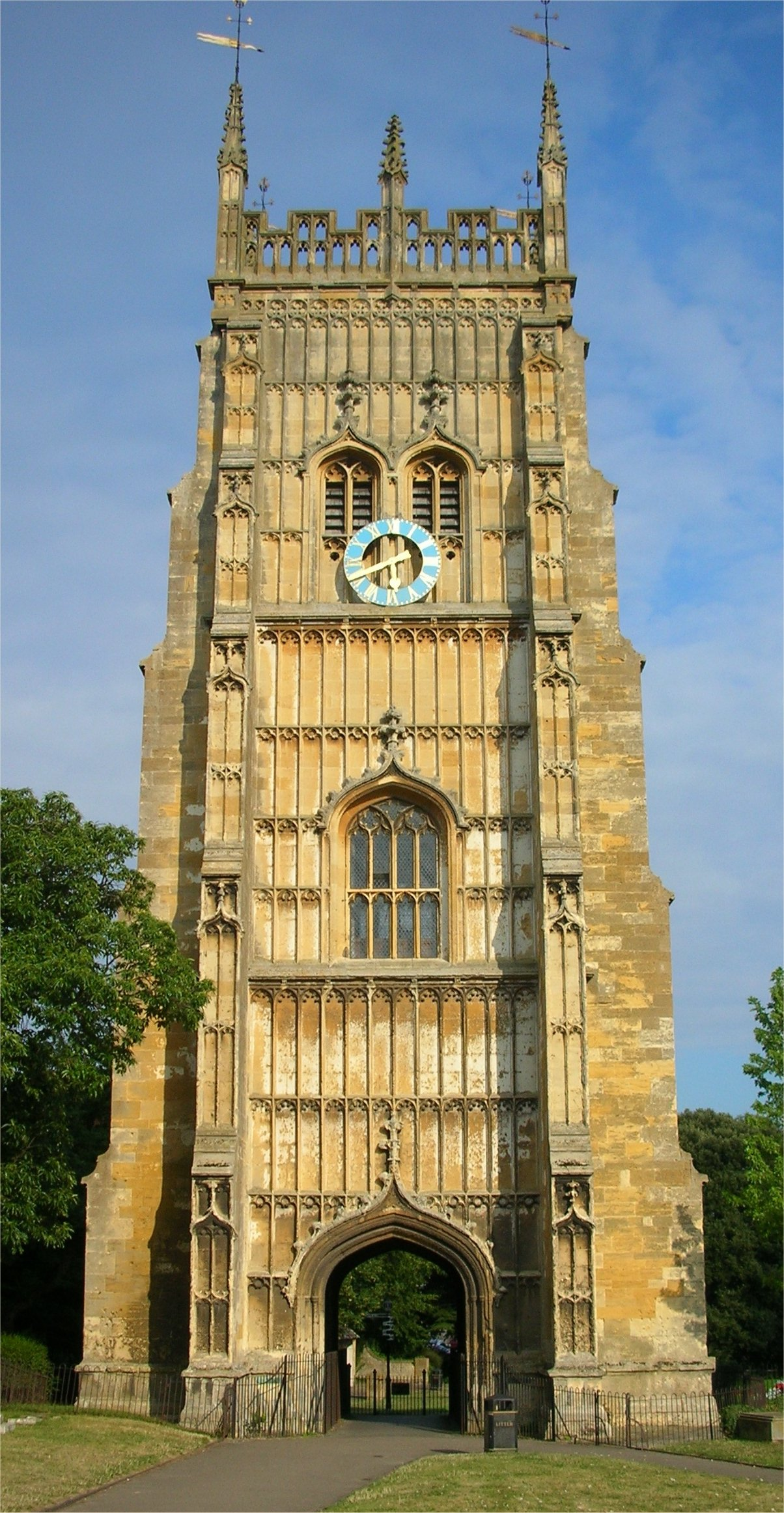
Evesham Abbey bell tower

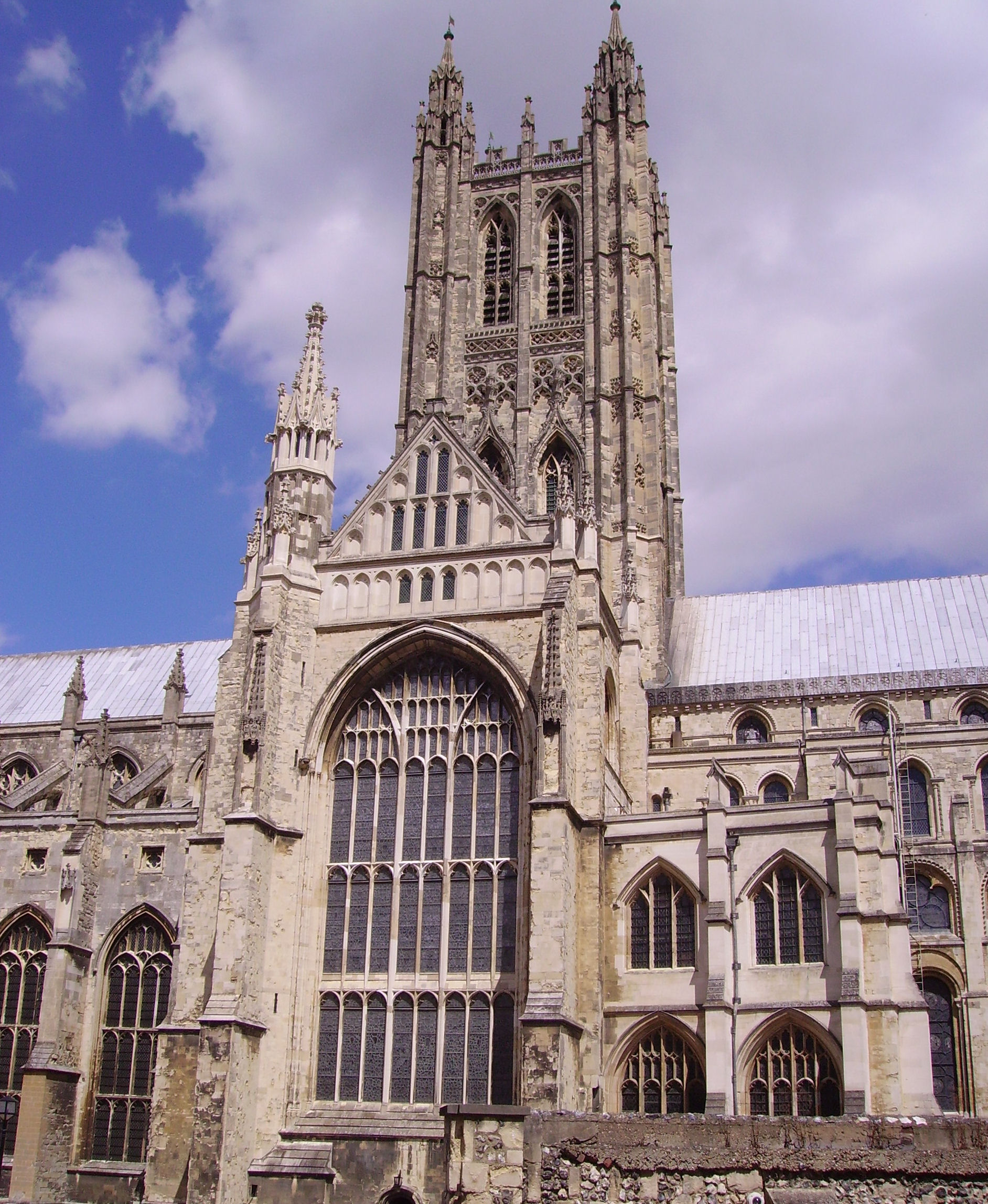
Canterbury Cathedral crossing tower and transepts

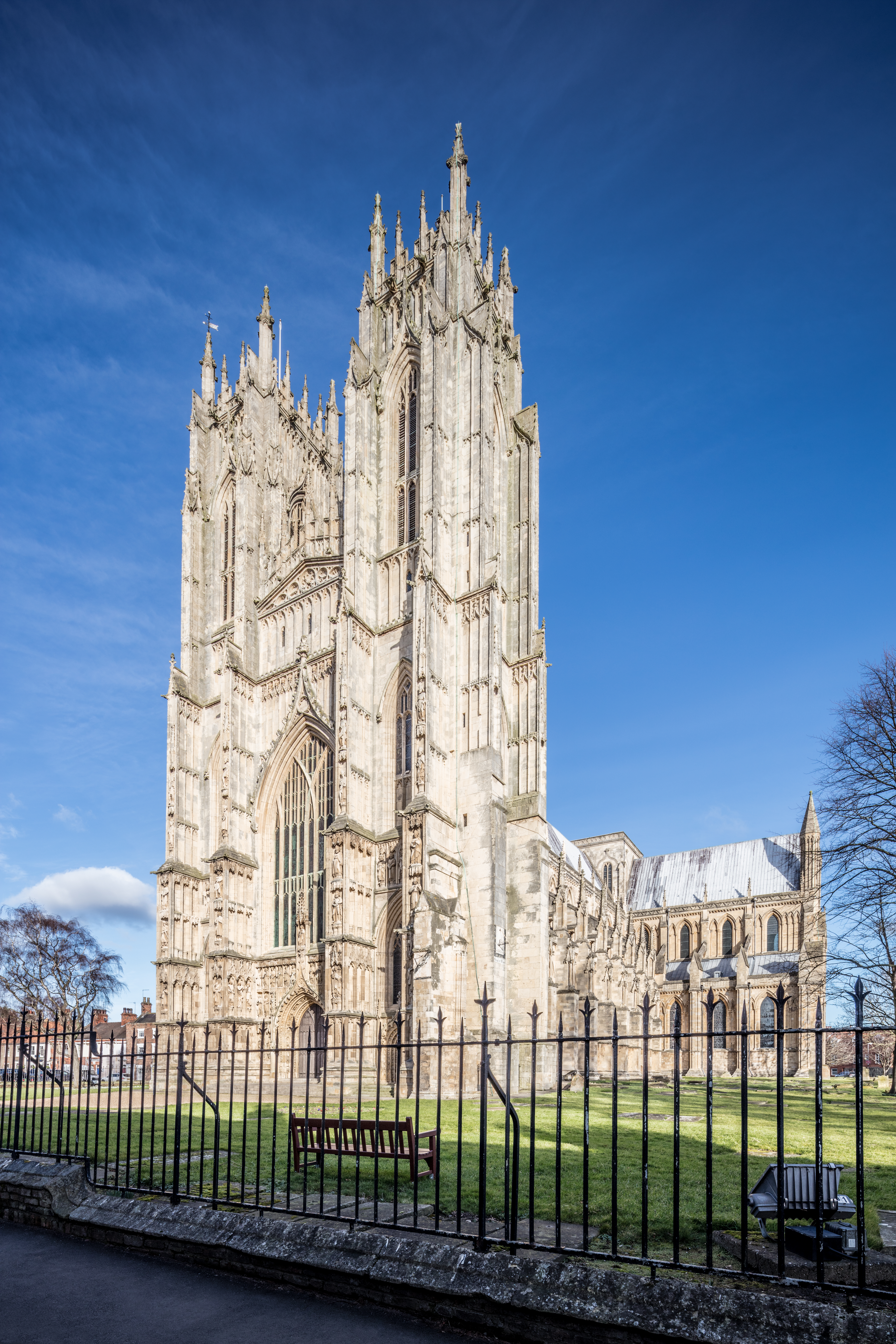
Beverley Minster west front

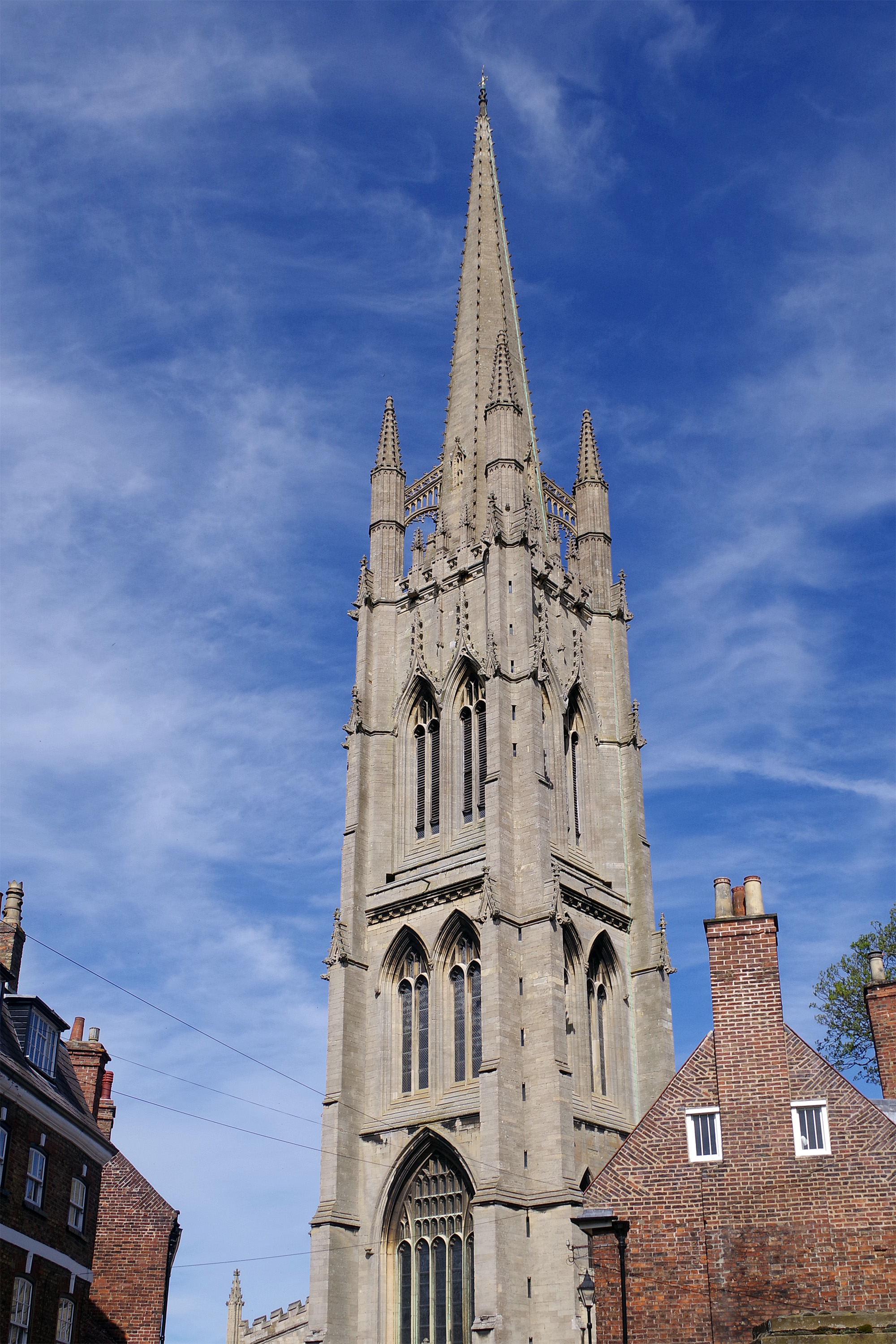
The tower and spire at St James' Church, Louth

The Perpendicular Gothic (or simply Perpendicular) is the third and final style of medieval Gothic architecture in England. It is characterised by an emphasis on vertical lines, and is sometimes called rectilinear. The Perpendicular style began to emerge in about 1330. The earliest example is the chapter house of Old St Paul's Cathedral, built by the royal architect William de Ramsey in 1332. The early style was also practised by another royal architect, John Sponlee, and fully developed in the works of Henry Yevele, William Wynford and John Lewyn.

Walls were built much higher than in earlier periods, and stained glass windows became very large, so that the space around them was reduced to simple piers. Horizontal transoms sometimes had to be introduced to strengthen the vertical mullions.

Many churches were built with magnificent towers including York Minster, Gloucester Cathedral, Worcester Cathedral, and St Botolph's Church, Boston, St Giles' Church, Wrexham, St Mary Magdalene, Taunton. Another outstanding example of Perpendicular is King's College Chapel, Cambridge.

The interiors of Perpendicular churches were filled with lavish ornamental woodwork, including misericords (choir stalls with lifting seats), under which were grotesque carvings; stylized "poppy heads", or carved figures in foliage on the ends of benches; and elaborate multicoloured decoration, usually in floral patterns, on panels or cornices called brattishing. The sinuous lines of the tracery in the Decorated style were replaced by more geometric forms and perpendicular lines.

The style was also affected by the tragic history of the period, particularly the Black Death, which killed an estimated third of England's population in 18 months between June 1348 and December 1349 and returned in 1361–62 to kill another fifth. This had a great effect on the arts and culture, which took a more sober direction.

The perpendicular Gothic was the longest of the English Gothic periods; it continued for a century after the style had nearly disappeared from France and the rest of the European continent, where the Renaissance had already begun. Gradually, near the end of the period, Renaissance forms began to appear in the English Gothic. A rood screen, a Renaissance ornament, was installed in the chapel of King's College Chapel, Cambridge. During the Elizabethan Period (1558–1603), the classical details, including the five orders of classical architecture, were gradually introduced. Carved ornament with Italian Renaissance motifs began to be used in decoration, including on the tomb of Henry VII in Westminster Abbey. The pointed arch gradually gave way to the Roman rounded arch, brick began to replace masonry, the roof construction was concealed, and the Gothic finally gave way to an imitation of Roman and Greek styles.

=== Characteristics ===
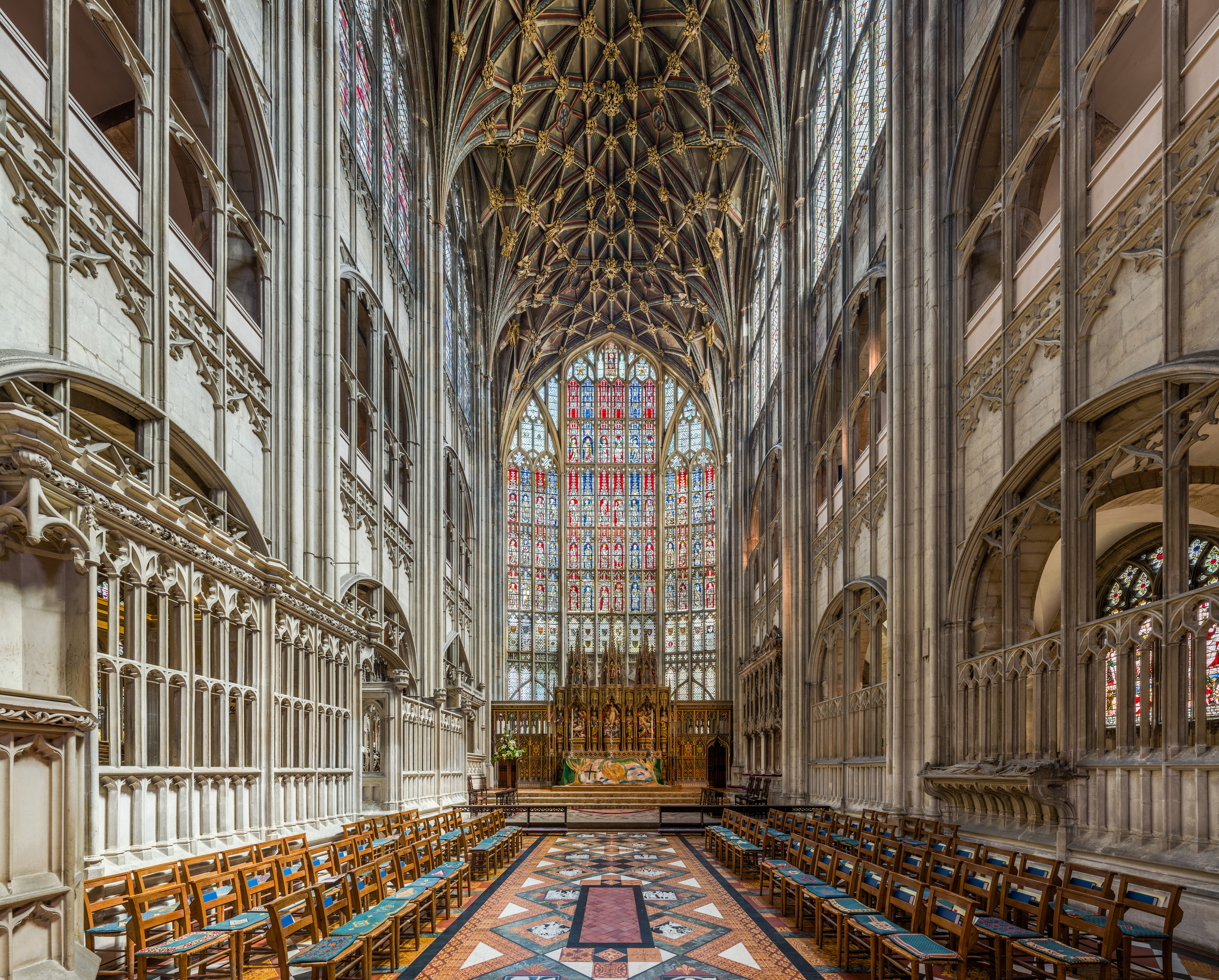
The choir of Gloucester Cathedral conveys an impression of a "cage" of stone and glass. Window tracery and wall decoration form integrated grids

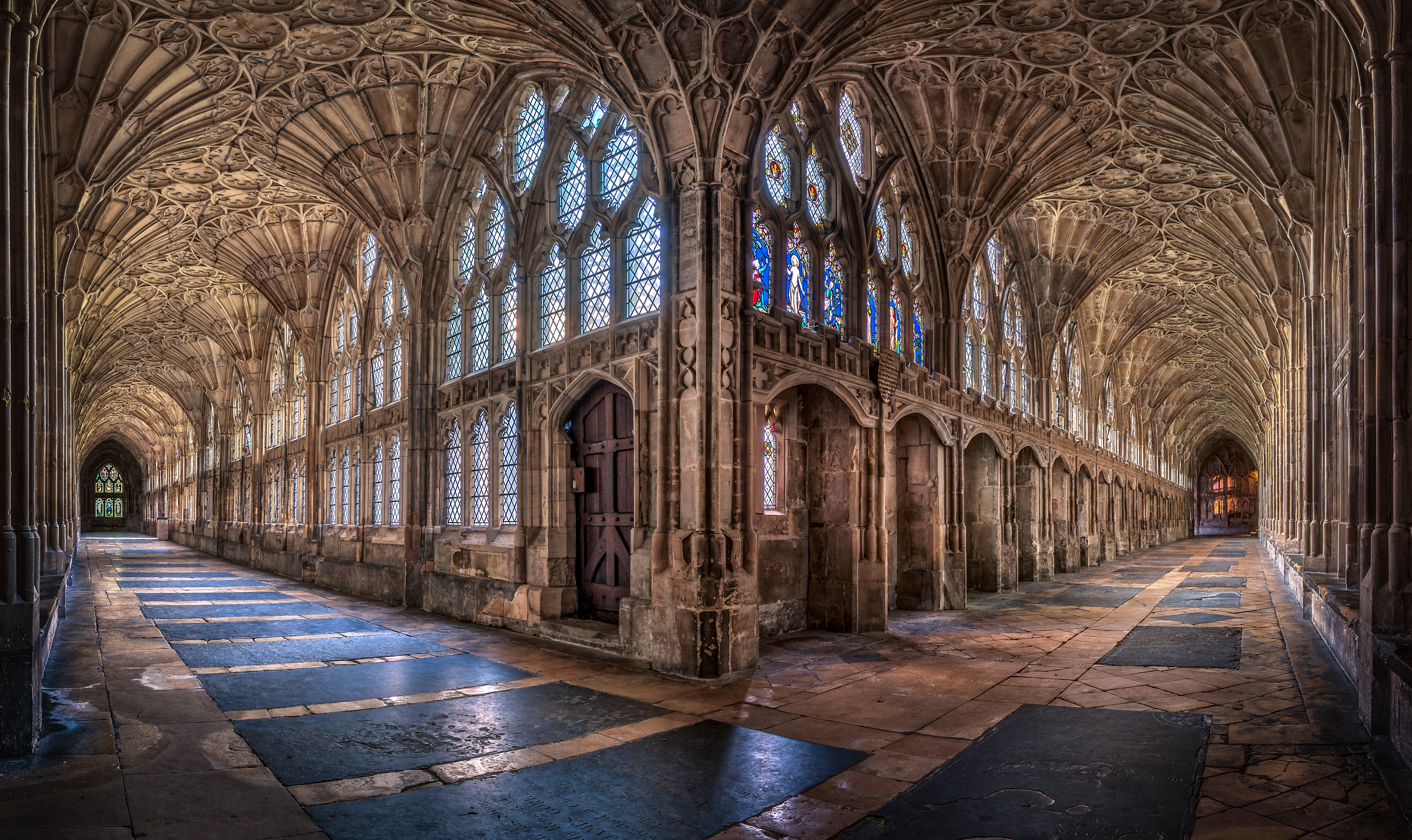
Gloucester Cathedral cloisters (1370–1412)

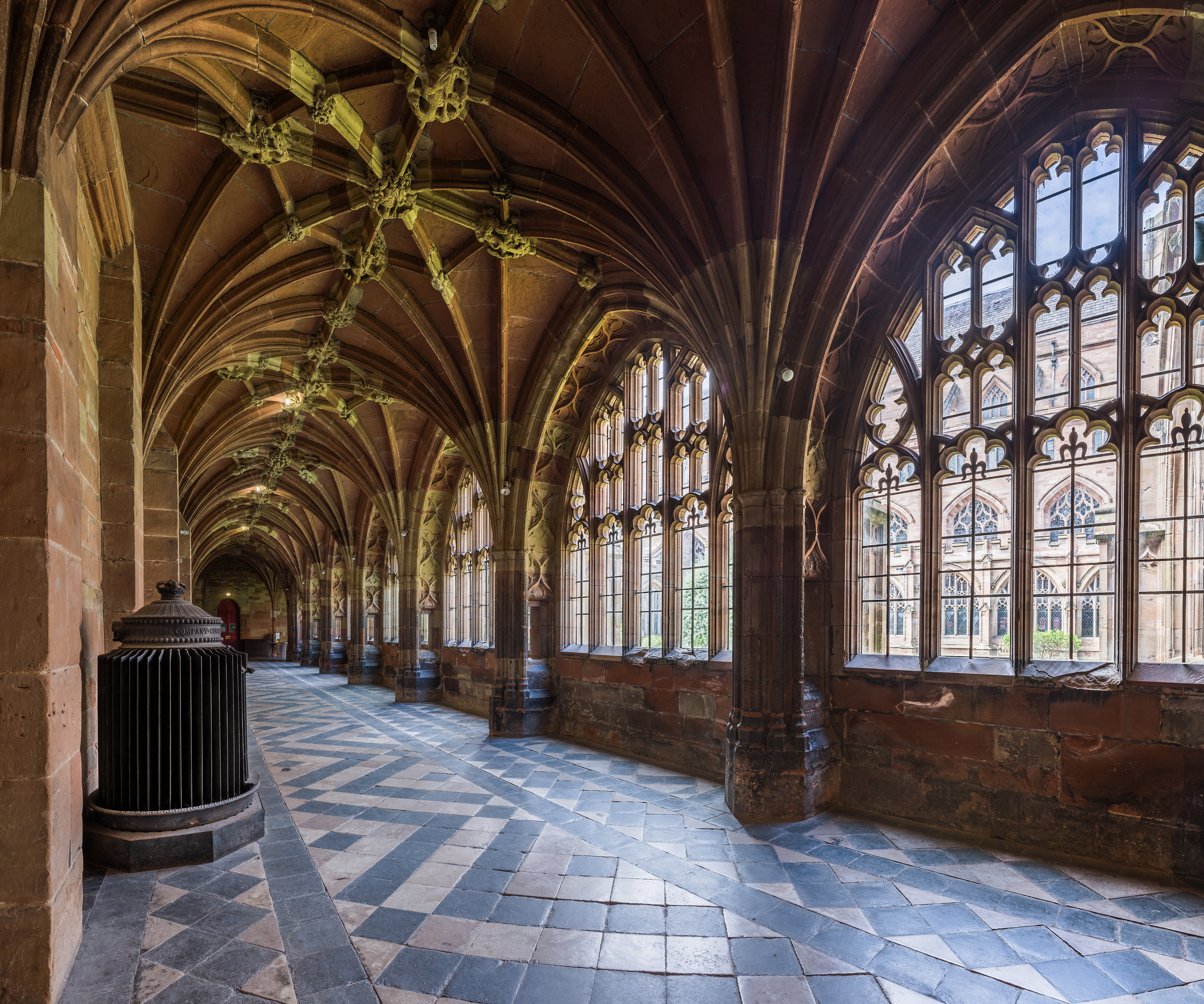
Worcester Cathedral cloister: mullions are reinforced with horizontal transoms (1404–1432)

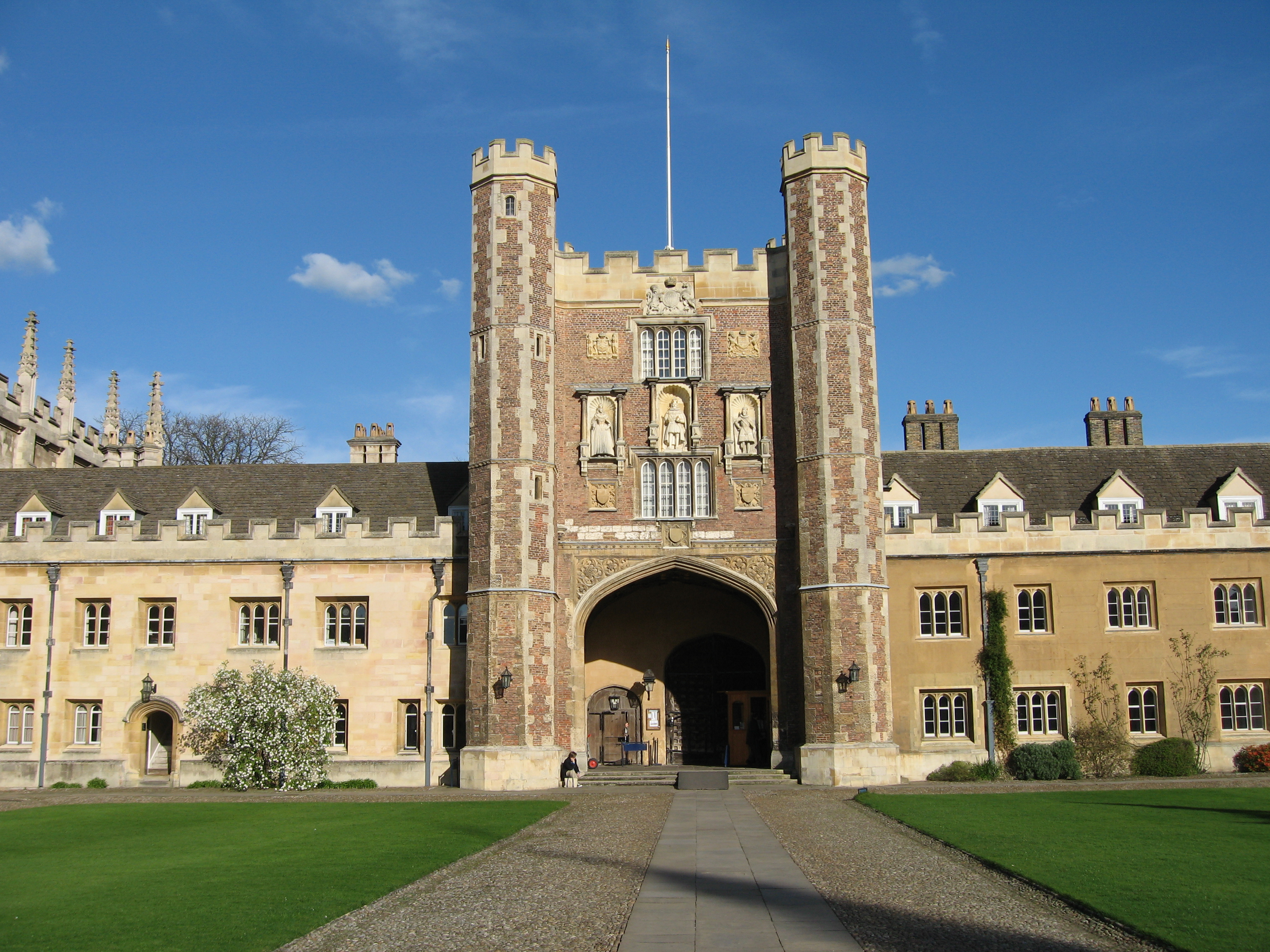
Gate of Trinity Great Court, Cambridge, with a four-centred arch
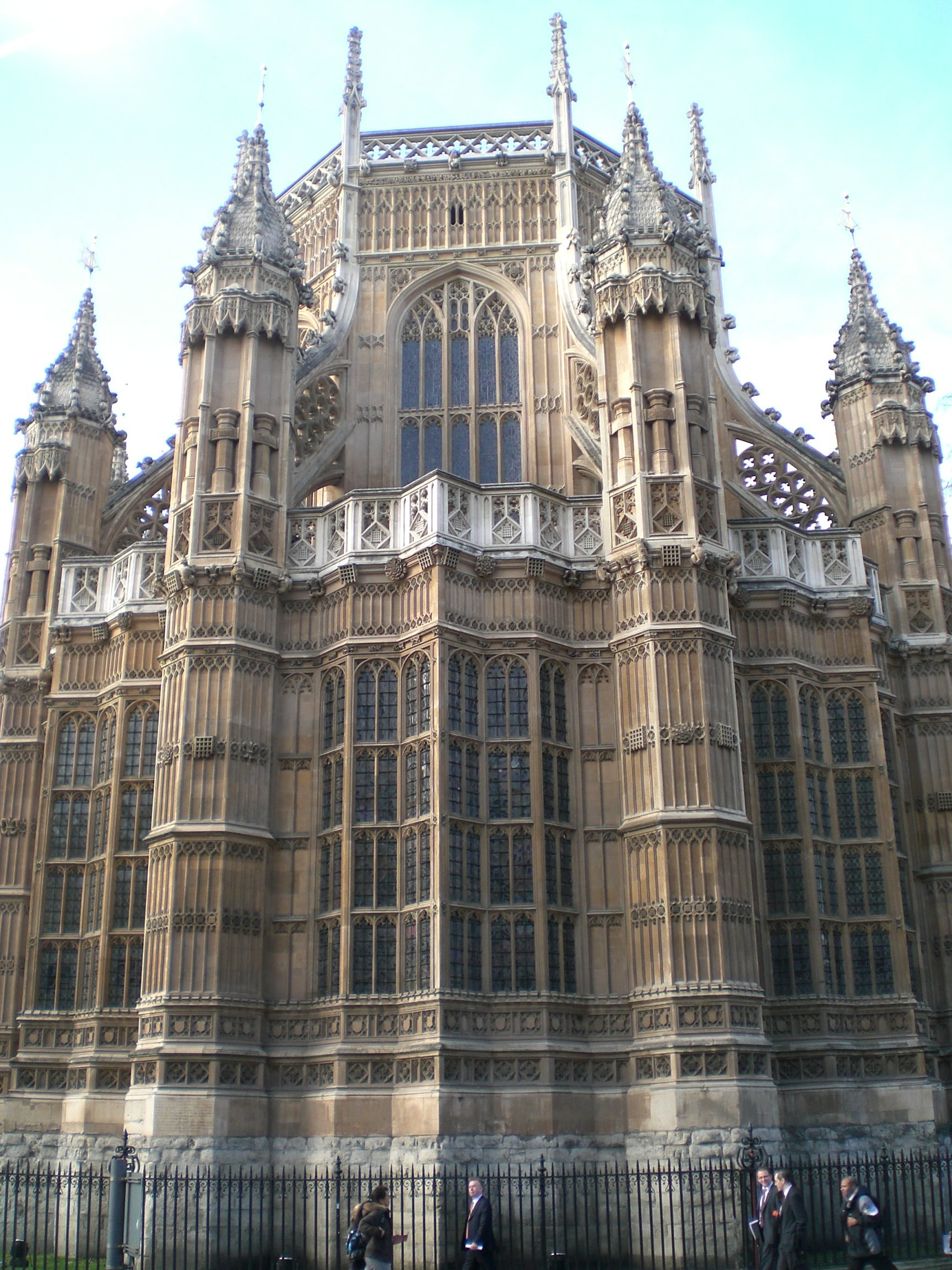
Henry VII Chapel at Westminster Abbey (completed 1519)

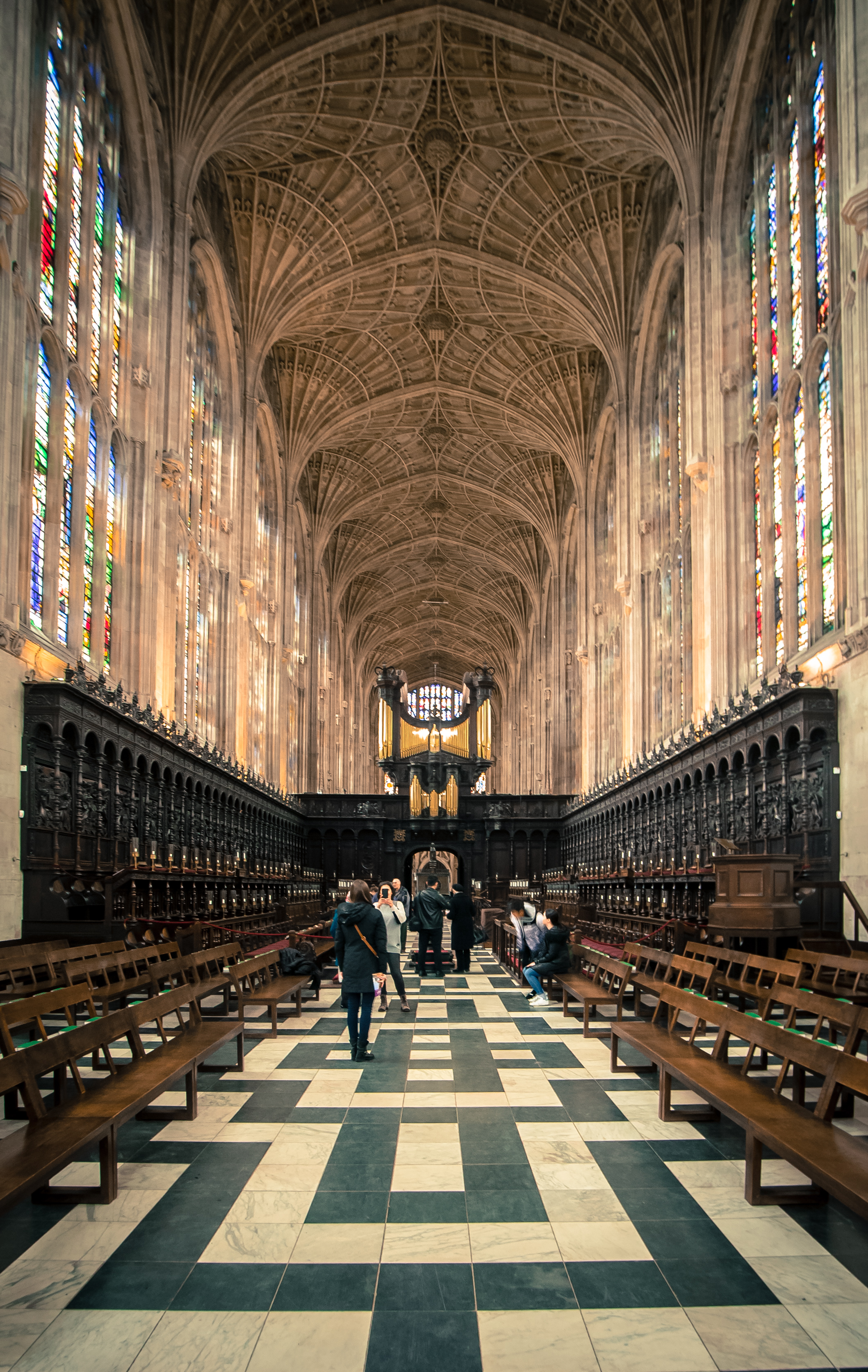
King's College Chapel, Cambridge (1446–1515)

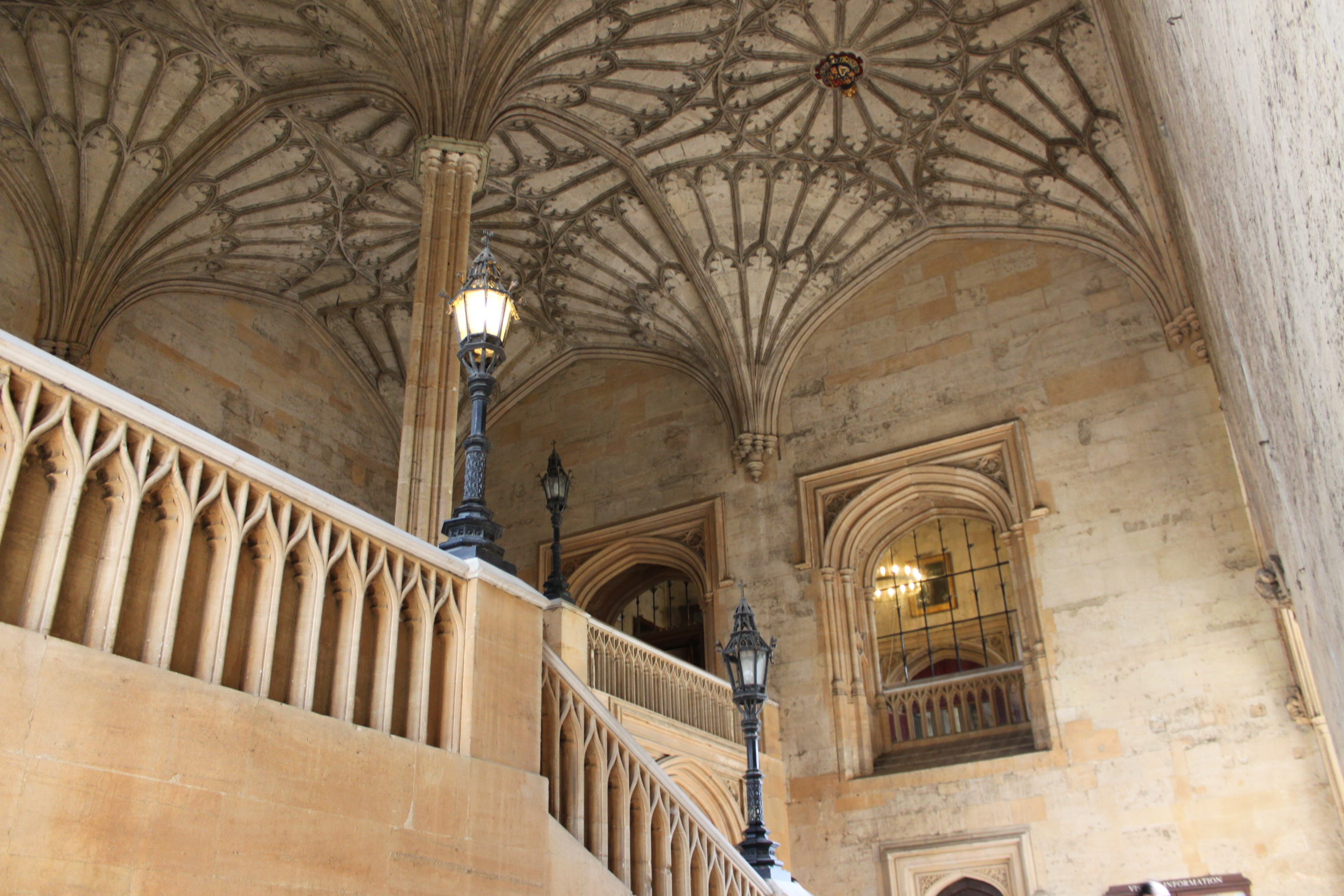
Fan vaulting outside the great hall of Christ Church, Oxford (c. 1640)
- Towers were an important feature of the perpendicular style, though fewer spires were built than in earlier periods. However, the tallest parish church spire of all was constructed at Louth, c.1455-1515. Important towers were built at Boston Church, Canterbury Cathedral, Gloucester Cathedral, York Minster, Worcester Cathedral, and on many smaller churches. Towers were generally crenellated, with or without spires, and the battlements were formed of openwork tracery.
- Fan vaulting appeared late in the Decorated. Unlike the lierne vault, the fan vault had no functional ribs; the visible "ribs" are mouldings on the masonry imitating ribs. The structure is composed of slabs of stone joined into half-conoids, whose vertices are the springers of the vault. The earliest extant structural example, from 1373, is found in the cloisters of Gloucester Cathedral, though Tewkesbury Abbey has an earlier ornamental one in a tomb, and the destroyed chapter house at Hereford Cathedral may have had one. Lierne vaults also continued in use, with notable examples at Gloucester, Canterbury, Winchester, St George's Chapel (Windsor) and Norwich.
- Windows became very large, sometimes of immense size, with slimmer stone mullions than in earlier periods, allowing greater scope for stained glass craftsmen. The mullions of the windows are carried vertically up into the arch moulding of the windows, and the upper portion is subdivided by additional mullions (supermullions) and transoms, forming rectangular compartments, known as panel tracery. The Tudor Arch window was a particular feature of English Gothic
- Buttresses and wall surfaces were divided into vertical panels
- Doorways were frequently enclosed within a square head over the arch mouldings, the spandrels being filled with quatrefoils or tracery. Pointed arches were still used throughout the period, but ogee and four-centred Tudor arches were also introduced
- Inside the church the triforium disappeared, or its place was filled with panelling, and greater importance was given to the clerestory windows, which often were the finest features in the churches of this period.
- Mouldings were flatter than those of the earlier periods, and one of the chief characteristics is the introduction of large elliptical hollows, termed a casement moulding.
- Flint architecture. In areas devoid of good building stone, elaborate flushwork decoration in flint and ashlar was used, especially in the wool churches of East Anglia.

=== Examples ===
- Front Quad and chapel of All Souls College, Oxford (1438–1442)
- Bath Abbey (1501–1539)
- Canterbury Cathedral: the nave, west front and cloisters (1379–1414), chapter house (1400–1412), transepts (1404–1414, south; 1470–1482, north), pulpitum (1410–1439), southwest tower (1423–1434), and central tower (1493–1497)
- Chester Cathedral; the west front, central tower and cloisters (1493–1530)
- Church of St John the Baptist, Cirencester
- Tom Quad, Christ Church, Oxford (1525–1529, including great hall)
- Front Quad, Corpus Christi College, Oxford (1515–et seq.; including hall and chapel)
- Divinity School, Oxford (1427–1483)
- Eton College Chapel, Eton (1441–1482)
- Gloucester Cathedral; the choir and transepts (1330–1374, remodel of Norman work), cloisters (1370–1412), west front, western nave vaults, and south porch (1421–1437), tower (1450–1467) and Lady chapel (1457–1483)
- King's College Chapel, Cambridge (1446–1515)
- St Peter and St Paul's Church, Lavenham
- Holy Trinity Church, Long Melford
- Magdalen College, Oxford (1474–1490, including old library, chapel, cloisters, and founder's tower; Magdalen Tower, Oxford, built 1492–1509)
- Manchester Cathedral (1422)
- New College, Oxford (1380–1400; including chapel, hall, Great Quad, cloisters and bell-tower)
- Norwich Cathedral; the clerestory of the presbytery (1362–1369; transitional in style), and vaults (1446–1472, nave; 1472–1499, presbytery; 1501–1536, transepts)
- The retro-choir (the New Building) at Peterborough Cathedral (1496–1508)
- Old Court, hall and chapel of Queens' College, Cambridge (1448–49)
- First Court (1511–1520, including hall) and Second Court (1598–1602), St. John's College, Cambridge
- Sherborne Abbey: choir (1475 – c. 1580), tower and nave
- South Wingfield Manor
- Collegiate Church of the Holy Trinity, Tattershall, Lincolnshire (1440s-80s) and Tattershall Castle (1440s)
- The tower of St Mary Magdalene, Taunton (1503–1508, rebuilt in 1858-62)
- Henry VII's Chapel at Westminster Abbey (1503–1509; heavily restored in the 1860s)
- Westminster Hall (a remodelling of a Norman hall)
- Winchester Cathedral; the west front (1346–1366), nave (1399–1419, remodel of Norman work) and presbytery (1493-1500), as well as a fine set of chantry chapels
- Worcester Cathedral, the central tower (1374) and cloisters (1375–1438)
- Winchester College, Hants. (1387–1394)
- St Giles' Church, Wrexham
- York Minster; the east end (1340–1408), central tower (1420–1472), Kings' Screen (1420–1422) and west towers (1433–1472)

== Roofs ==
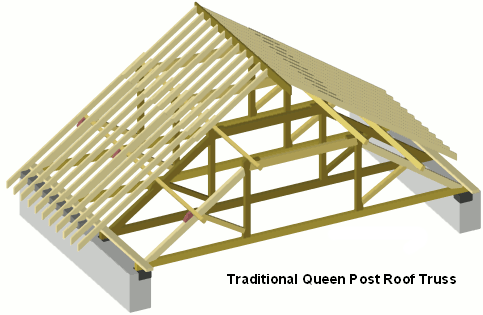
A queen-post truss

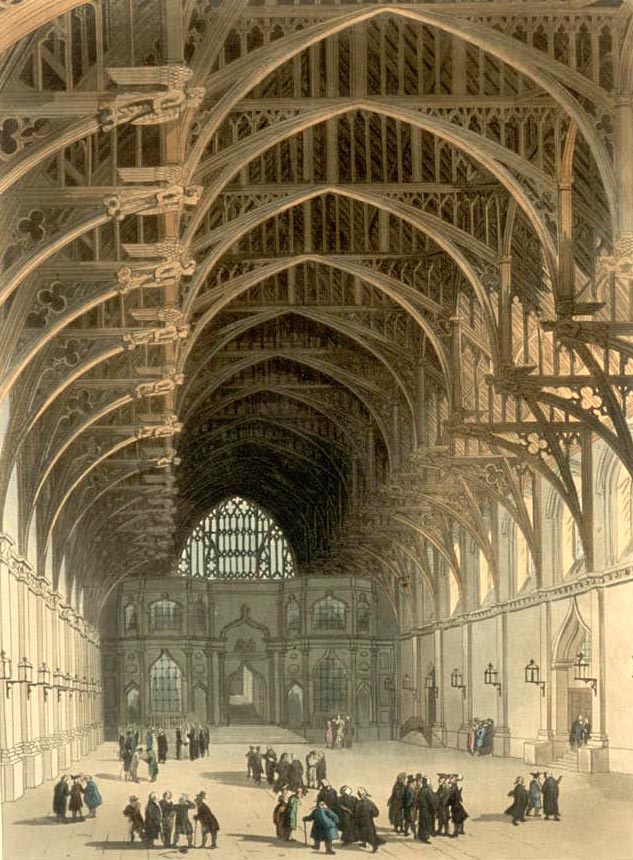
Hammerbeam timber roof of Westminster Hall (1395)

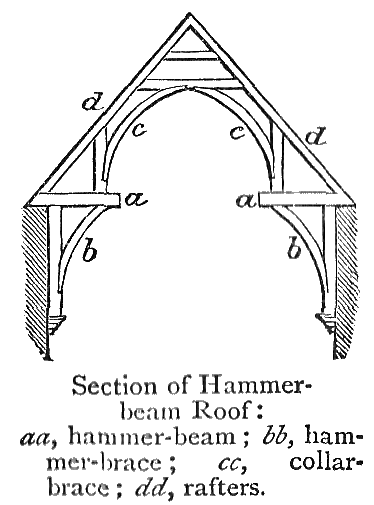
Section of a hammerbeam timber roof

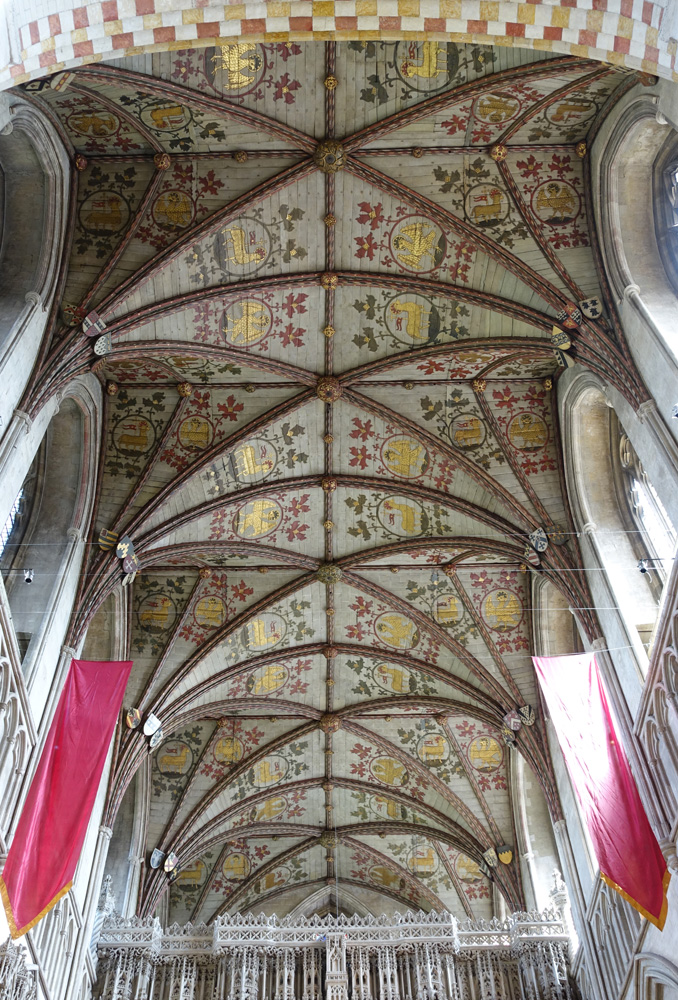
Timber vaulting, St Albans Cathedral

The pitched Gothic timber roof was a distinctive feature of the style, both in religious and domestic architecture. It had to be able to resist rain, snow and high winds of the English climate, and to preserve the integrity of the structure. A pitched roof was a common feature of all the Gothic periods. During the Norman period, the roofs normally were pitched forty-five degrees, with the apex forming a right angle. With the arrival of the pointed rib vault, the roofs became steeper, up to sixty degrees. In the late perpendicular period, the angle declined to twenty degrees or even less. The roofs were usually made of boards overlaid with tiles or sheet-lead, which was commonly used on low-pitched roofs.

The simpler Gothic roofs were supported by long rafters of light wood, resting on wooden trusses set into the walls. The rafters were supported by more solid beams, called purlins, which were carried at their ends by the roof trusses. The tie-beam is the chief beam of the truss. Later, the roof was supported by structures called a King-point-truss and Queen-post truss, where the principal rafters are connected with the tie beam by the head of the truss. The King-Point truss has a vertical beam with connects the centre of the rafter to the ridge of the roof, supported by diagonal struts, while a Queen-Post truss has a wooden collar below the pointed arch which united the posts and was supported by struts and cross-braces. A Queen-Post truss could span a width of forty feet. Both of these forms created greater stability, but the full weight of the roof still came down directly onto the walls.

Gothic architects did not like the roof truss systems, because the numerous horizontal beams crossing the nave obstructed the view of the soaring height. They came up with an ingenious solution, the Hammerbeam roof. In this system, the point of the roof is supported by the collar and trusses, but from the collar curved beams reach well downward on the walls, and carry the weight downward and outwards, to the walls and buttresses, without obstructing the view. The oldest existing roof of this kind is found in Winchester Cathedral. The most famous example of the Hammerbeam roof is the roof of Westminster Hall (1395), the largest timber roof of its time, built for royal ceremonies such as the banquets following the coronation of the King. Other notable wooden roofs included those of Christ Church, Oxford, Trinity College, Cambridge, and Crosby Hall, London. A similar system, with arched trusses, was used in the roof of Wrexham Cathedral.

== University Gothic ==
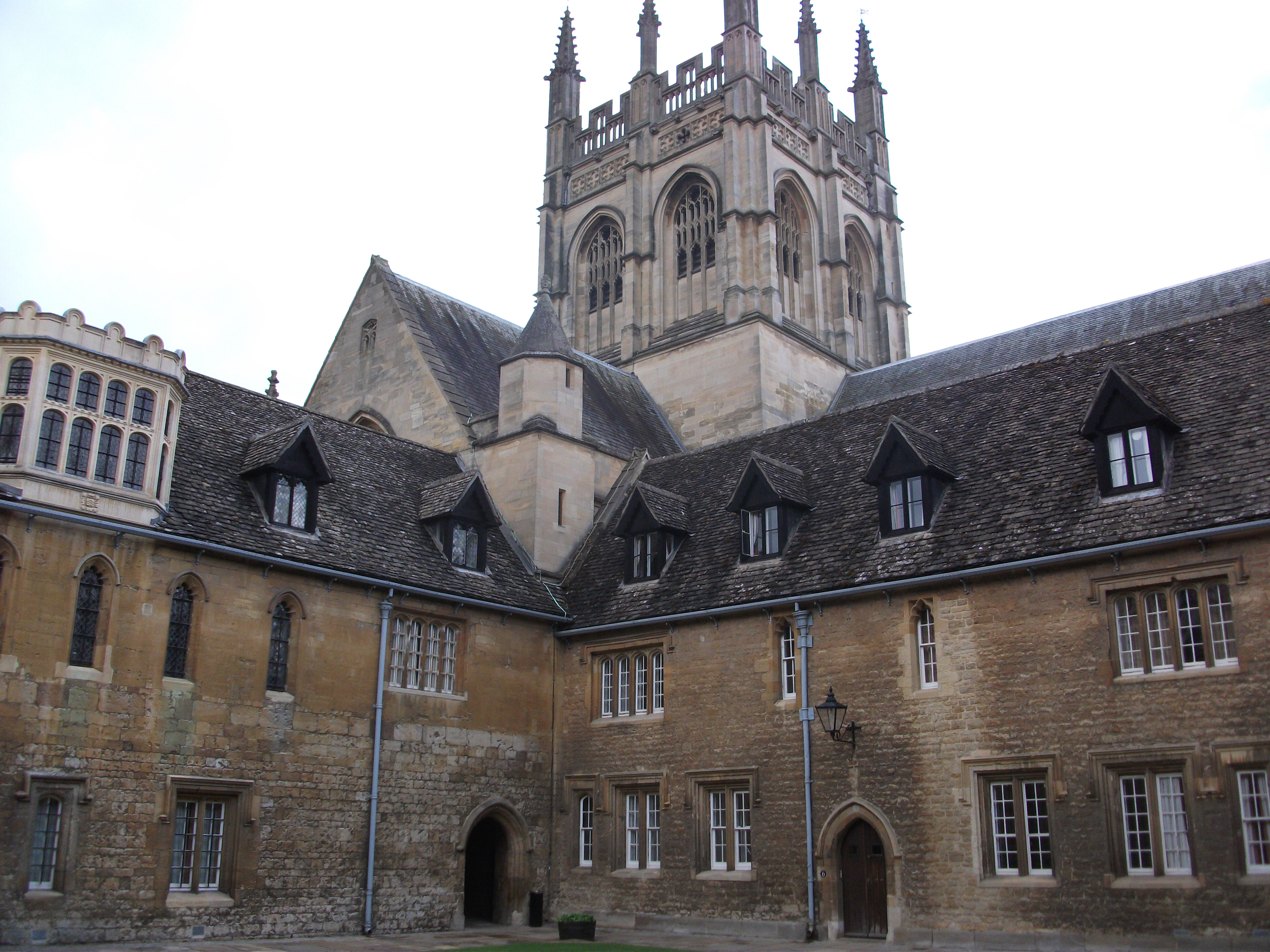
Mob Quad, Merton College, Oxford (1288–1378)

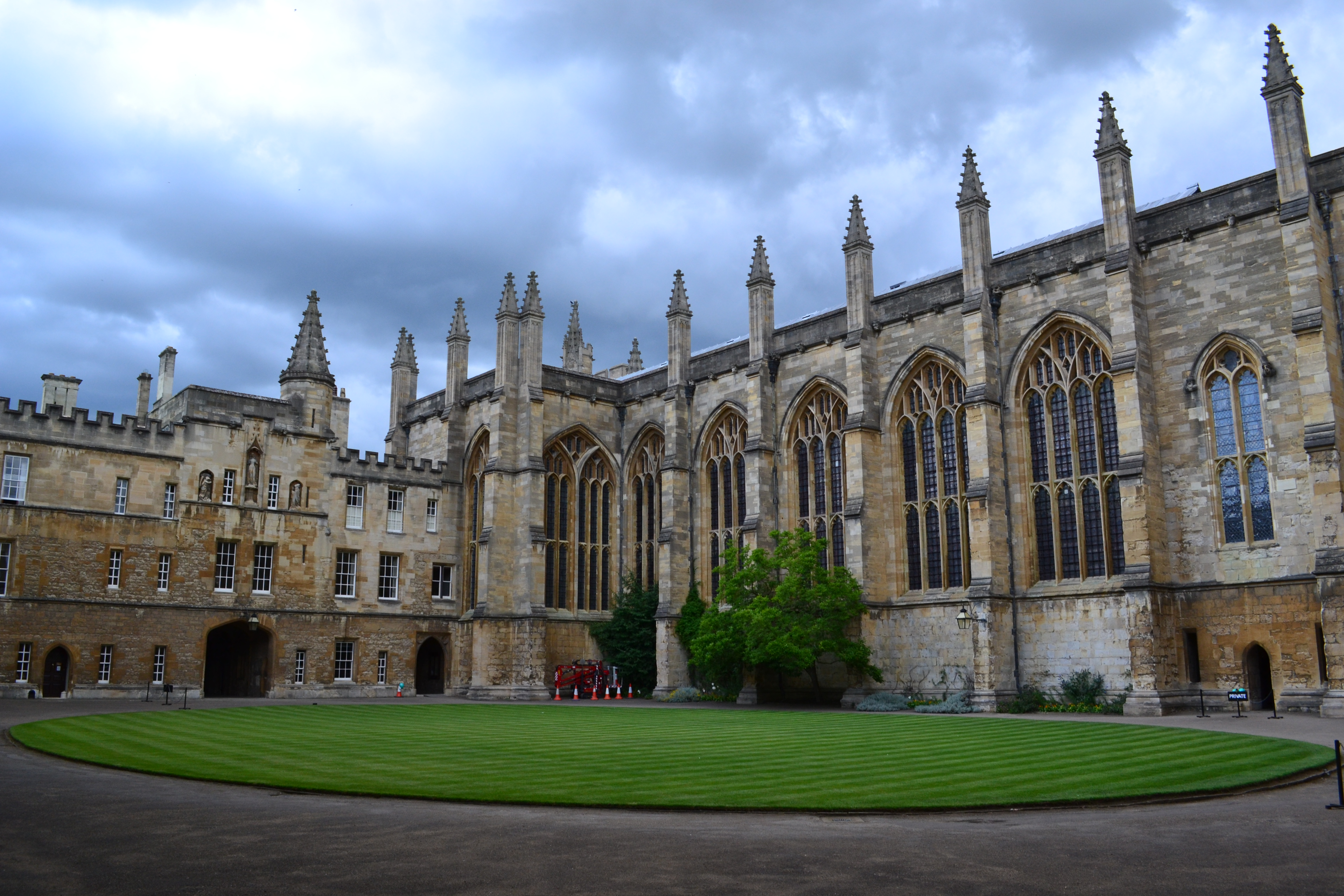
Front Quad at New College, Oxford. The chapel is on the centre-right, while the smaller window on the far-right belongs to the hall.

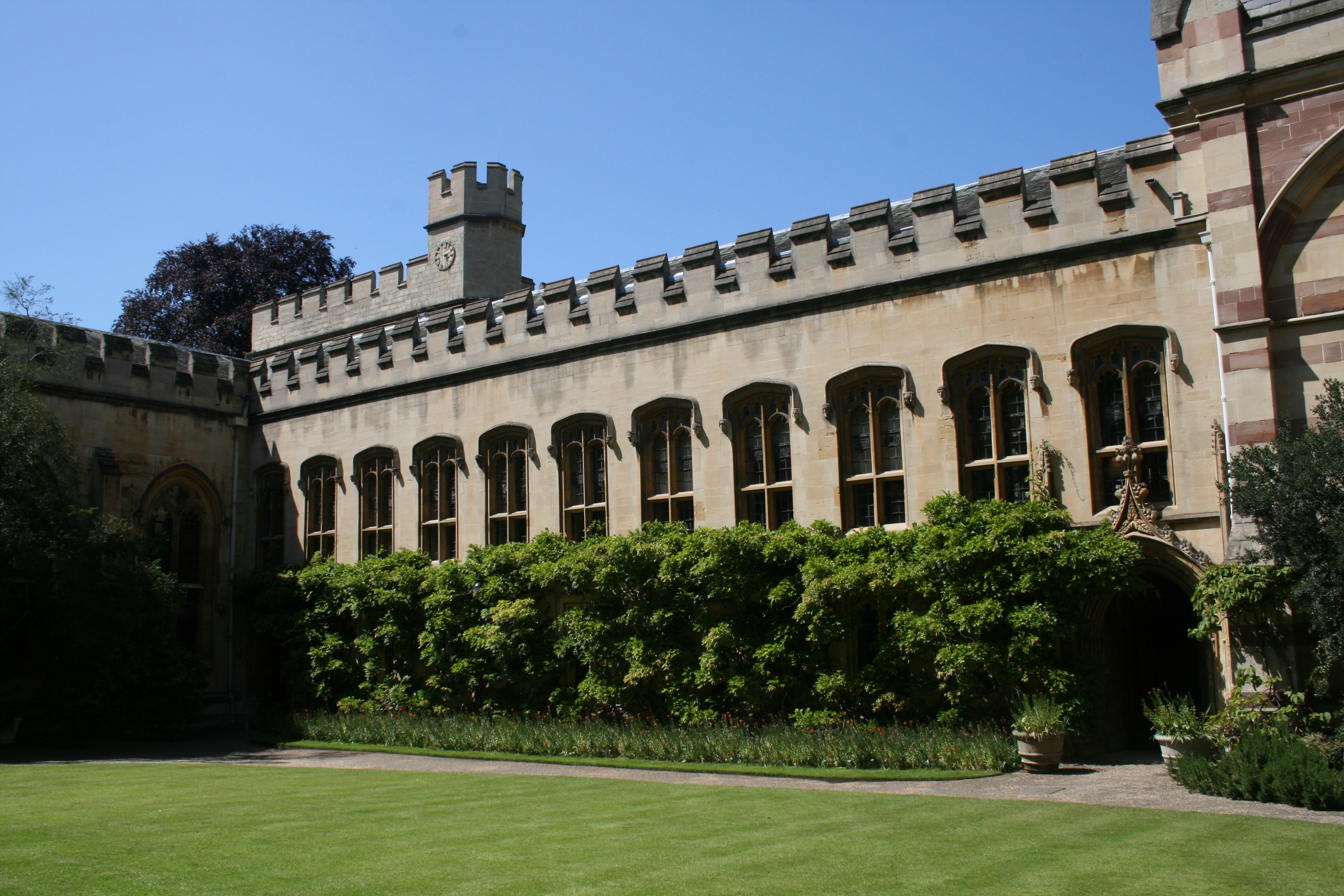
Balliol College, Oxford front quad (1431)

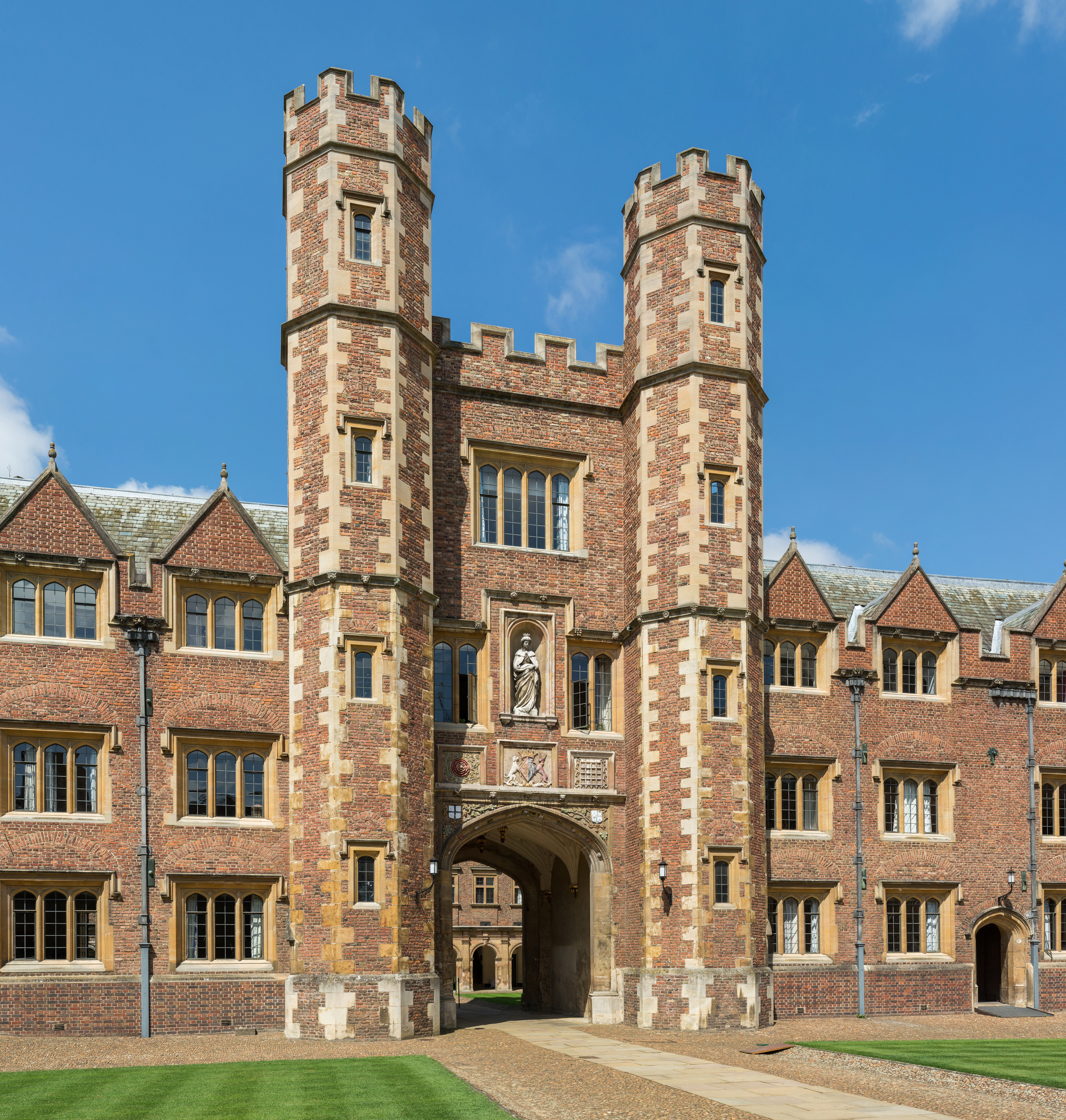
Second Court, St John's College, Cambridge

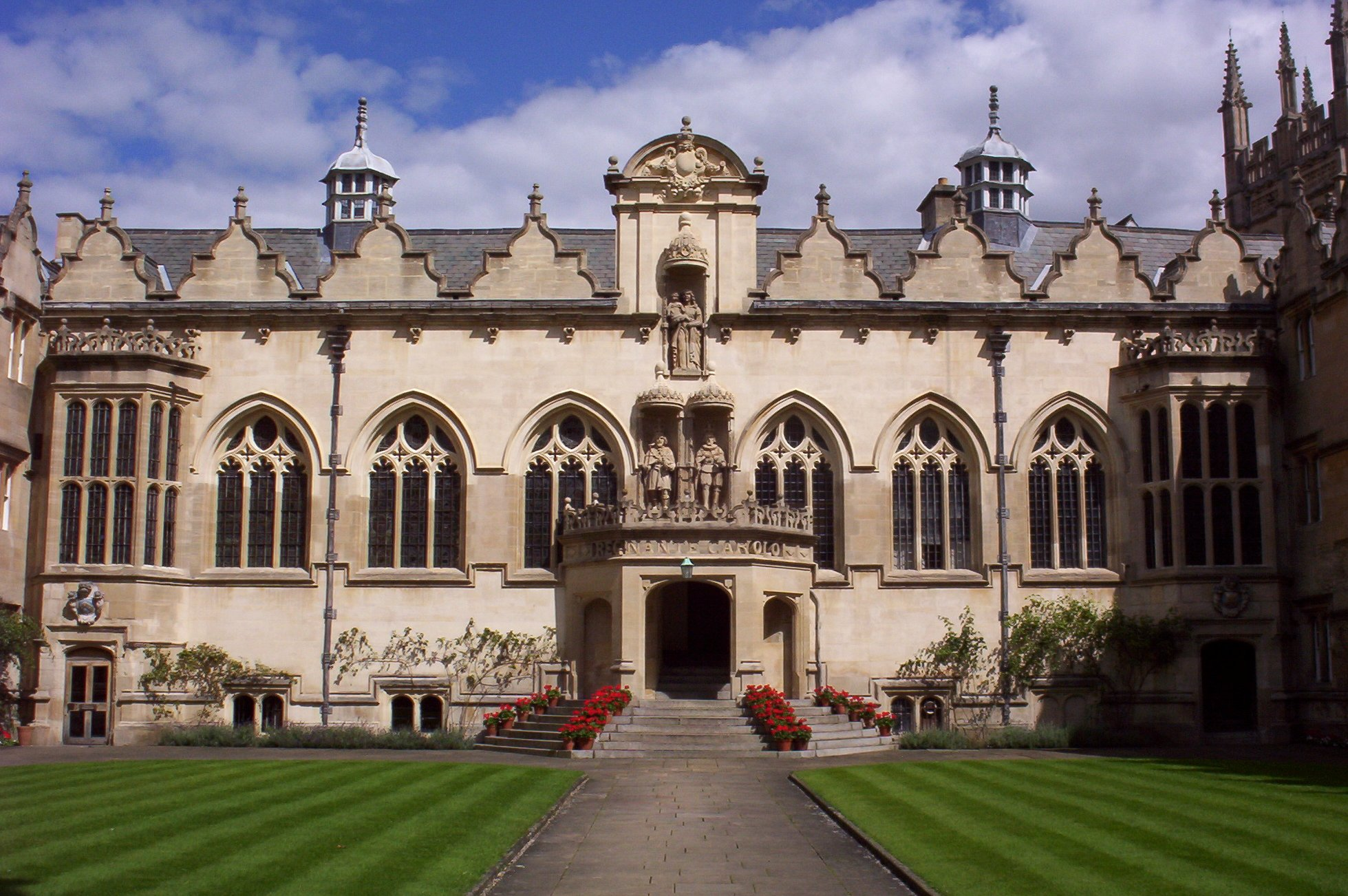
Gothic Survival at the east range of First Quad, Oriel College, Oxford (1637–1642)

The Gothic style was adopted in English university buildings, due in part to the close connection between the universities and the church. At this time Oxford and Cambridge were the only universities in the country. The oldest existing example of University Gothic in England is probably the Mob Quad of Merton College, Oxford, constructed between 1288 and 1378. The late 14th century work of bishop William of Wykeham and his master mason William Wynford was crucial in creating an architectural form for colleges, at Winchester College and New College, Oxford. These foundations were built around regular courtyards, with imposing gate towers, and the hall and chapel end-to-end. This form became the norm for collegiate architecture, with colleges growing round 'quads' in Oxford and 'courts' in Cambridge. Henry VI's joint foundations at Eton and King's would have far outshone Wykeham's, but he was deposed before either could be completed. Variations emerged between Cambridge and Oxford, with Cambridge adopting brick in the 15th century (notably at Queens') and favouring tall turreted gatehouses reminiscent of the mansions of East Anglia, whereas Oxford favoured stone and developed a T-shaped form of chapel, where the ante-chapel ran transeptally, as at New College. The Gothic survived at Oxford well into the 17th century, long after it had fallen from fashion elsewhere.

== Gothic Revival (19th and 20th centuries) ==
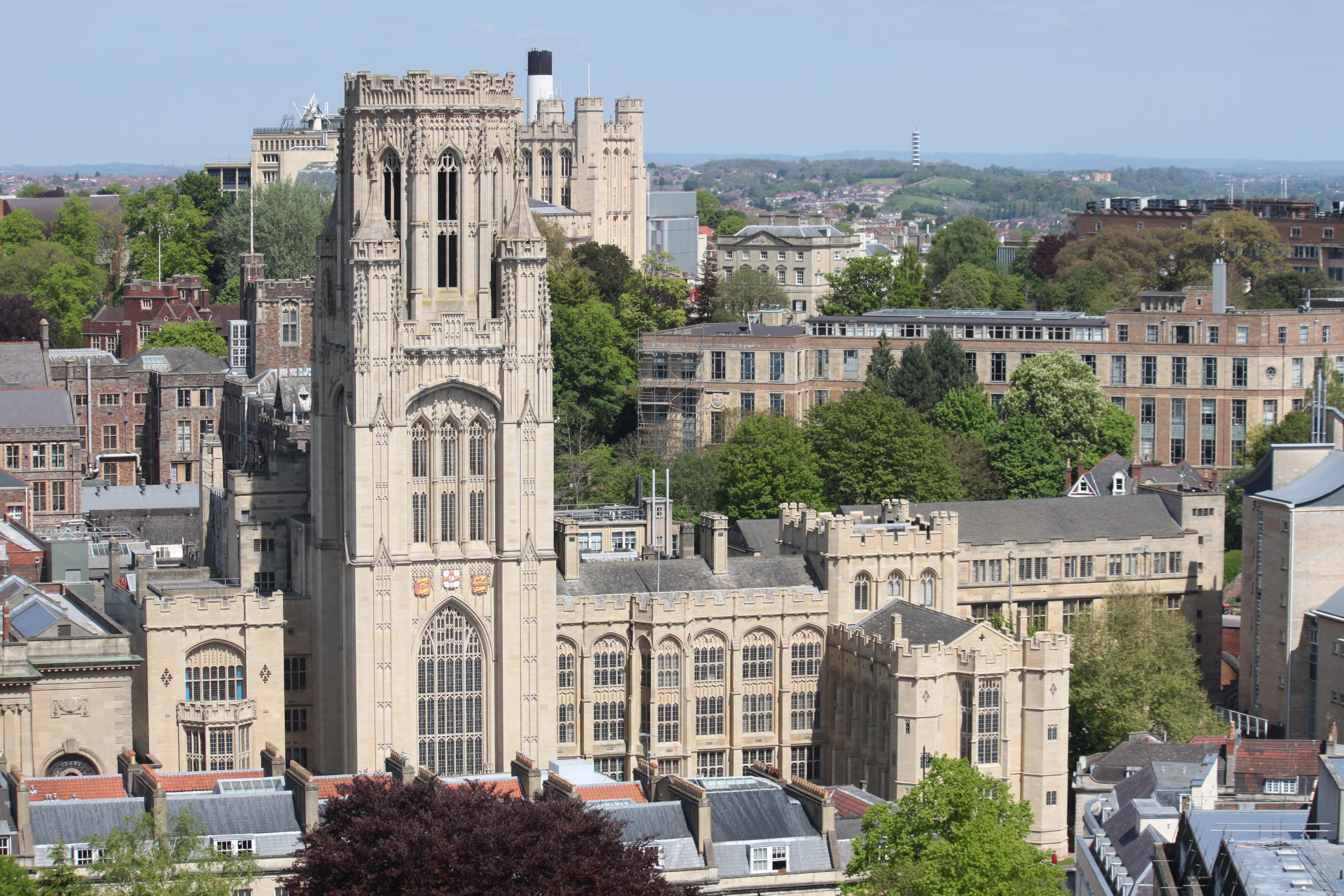
Wills Memorial Building, University of Bristol (1915–1925)

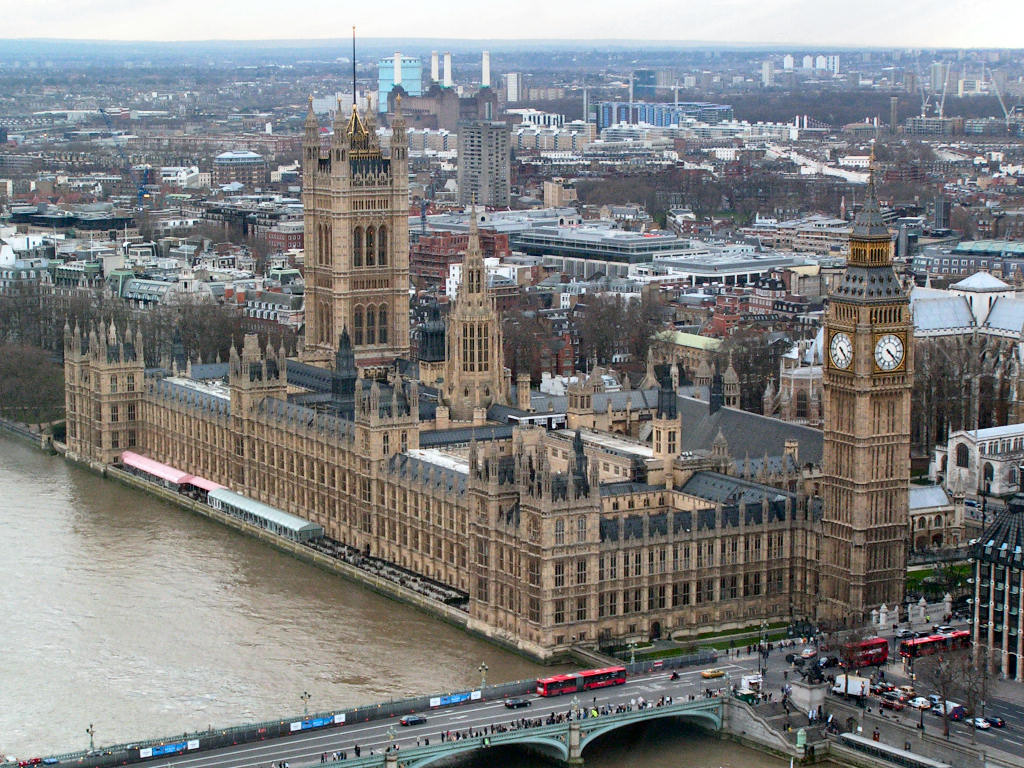
Palace of Westminster, rebuilt by Barry and Pugin 1840–1876

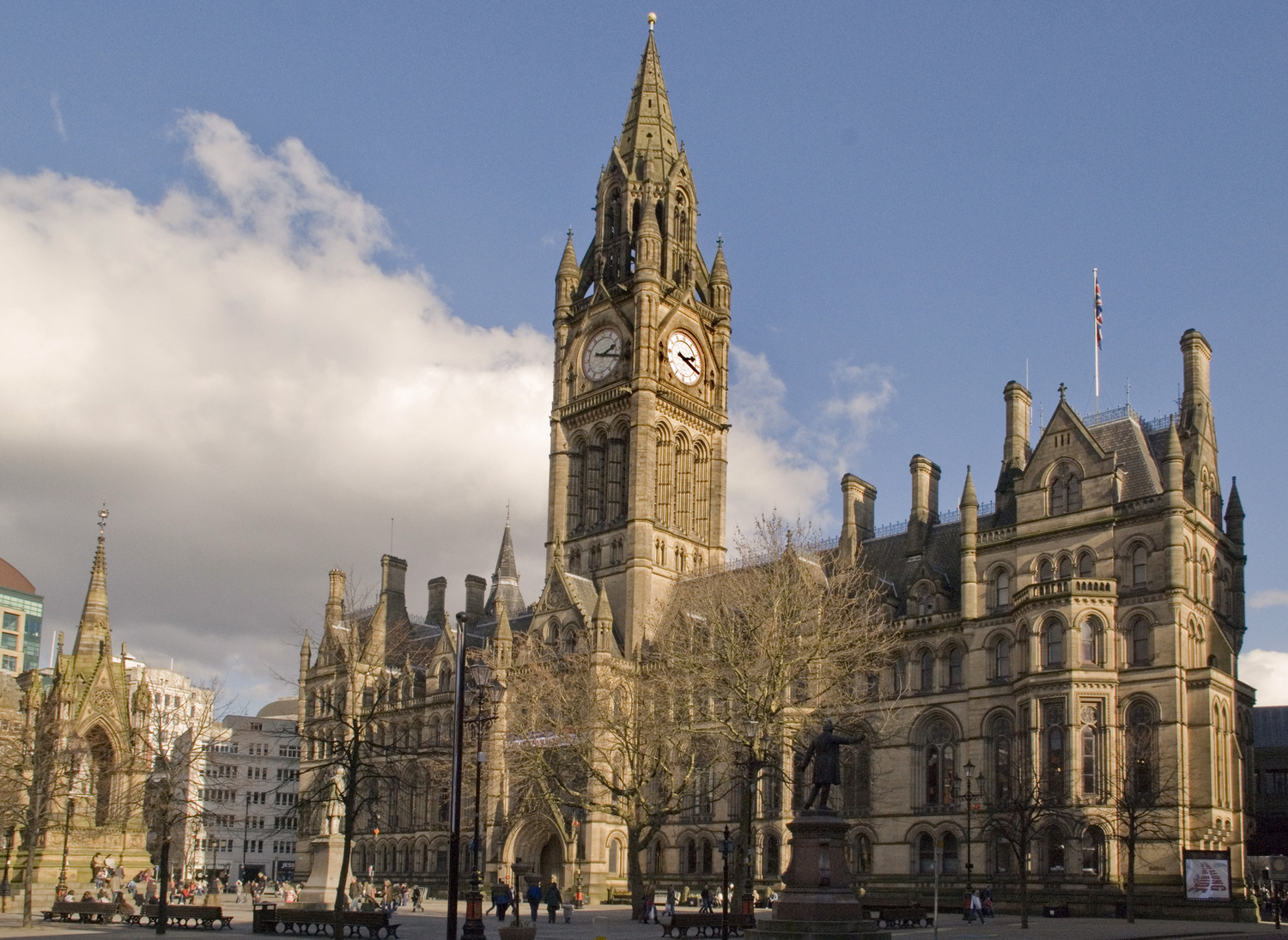
Manchester Town Hall, (1868–1877)

Tower Bridge, London, (1886–1894)

The Perpendicular style was less often used in the Gothic Revival than the Decorated style, but major examples include the rebuilt Palace of Westminster (i.e. the Houses of Parliament) and Bristol University's Wills Memorial Building (1915–1925).

== See also ==
- Architecture of the medieval cathedrals of England
- Building a Gothic cathedral
- Cathedral architecture of Western Europe
- Collegiate Gothic
- English Gothic stained glass windows
- French Gothic architecture
- Gothic Revival architecture
- Poor Man's Bible

== Bibliography ==
- Bechmann, Roland (2017). Les Racines des Cathédrals (in French). Paris: Payot. ISBN 978-2-228-90651-7.
- Ducher, Robert, Caractéristique des Styles, (1988), Flammarion, Paris (in French); ISBN 2-08-011539-1
- Harvey, John (1961). English Cathedrals. Batsford. OCLC 2437034.
- Smith, A. Freeman (1922). English Church Architecture of the Middle Ages - an Elementary Handbook. T. Fisher Unwin.
- Martin, G. H.; Highfield, J. R. L. (1997). A history of Merton College, Oxford. Oxford: Oxford University Press. ISBN 0-19-920183-8.
