= Christine Elizabeth Murray =

Irish poet, feminist, literary activist

- Education: University College Dublin

Christine Elizabeth Murray is an Irish poet and feminist who works to improve the visibility of women writers. She graduated from University College Dublin with a degree in Art History and English Literature. She also completed a diploma in Web Development from the National College of Ireland. She qualified as a stone cutter and has worked with the Office of Public Works in Ireland where she does restoration stone work mostly in Limerick and Kerry. Two historic sites she has worked on are Ross Castle and Ardfert Cathedral in County Kerry. Murray writes poetry predominantly for publication though she has done performance poetry. In 2012 at The Béal Festival of New Music and Poetry her "Lament for Three Women's Voices" was performed. She's on the PEN International Women Writer's Committee and is the Social Media coordinator for Irish PEN. She founded Poethead which is dedicated to women writers and is a member of Fired! Irish Women Poets and the Canon.

== Bibliography ==
- Three Red Things, 2013
- Cycles, 2013
- The Blind, 2013
- Signature, 2014
- A Hierarchy of Halls, 2018
- Bind, 2018

Anthologies

- And Agamemnon Dead: An Anthology of Early 21st Century Irish Poetry
- All The Worlds Between, 2017
- The Gladstone Readings, 2017
