= William Steere (priest) =

Irish Anglican bishop

William Steere was an Irish Anglican priest in the seventeenth century.

He was Dean of Ardfert from 1620 to 1628 when he became Bishop of Ardfert and Aghadoe. In 1636 he was presented In commendam with the Archdeaconries of Cork and Cloyne. He died in office on 21 January 1638.

Church of Ireland titles
| Preceded by Robert Chaffe | Dean of Ardfert; 1620–1628 | Succeeded by Charles Baden |
| Preceded by John Steere | Bishop of Ardfert and Aghadoe; 1628–1638 | Succeeded by Thomas Fulwar |
| Preceded by Michael Boyle | Archdeacon of Cork; 1636–1638 | Succeeded by Martin Tuely |
| Preceded by Michael Boyle | Archdeacon of Cloyne; 1636–1638 | Succeeded by Philip Bysse |
