= Sedilia =

Church seats for Catholic clergy

- Type: Liturgical furniture
- Material: Stone (limestone, clunch, or freestone)
- Period/culture: 12th–14th centuries (with 19th-century revival)
- Place: South wall of church chancels
- Culture: Christian (primarily English and Western European)

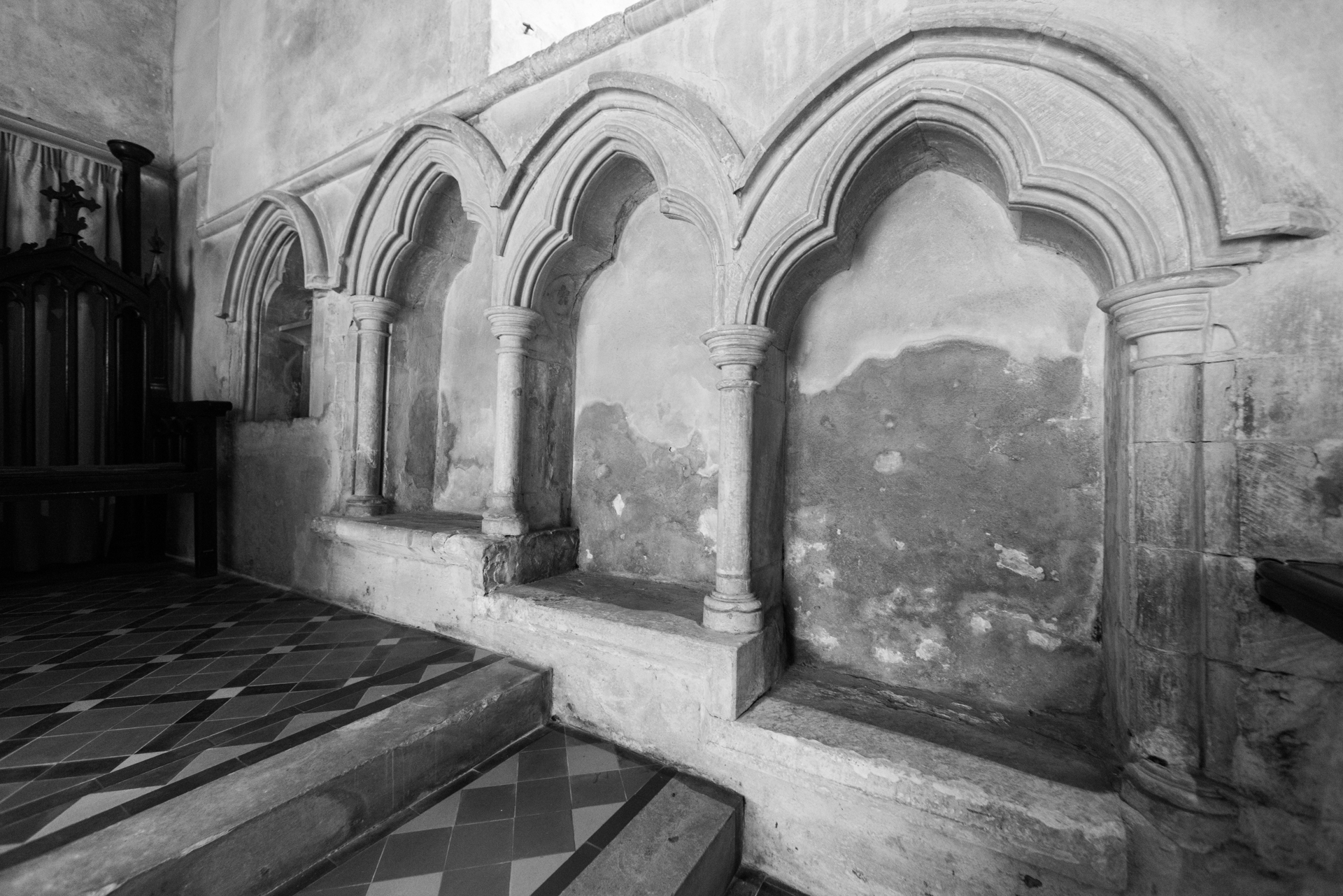
A three-level sedilia and piscina (at left) recessed into the thickness of the wall; nave built around 1180, chancel re-built in C13, in St Mary's church, in Buriton, Hampshire, England. The seats are low and cold to sit on; the addition of four inches of cushion makes them comfortable.

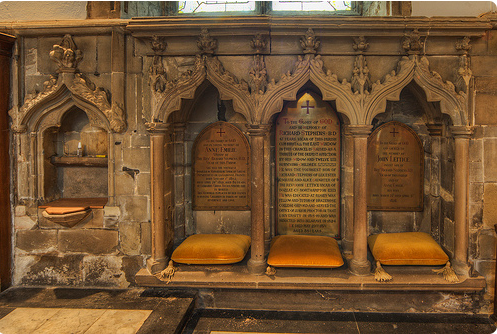
Sedilia

In church architecture, sedilia (plural of Latin: sedīle, 'seat') are built-in or freestanding structures specially provided for seating the officiating clergy during Mass. Their forms, decoration, and positioning have symbolic liturgical and social meaning.

In England they were typically made of stone, located on the liturgical south side of the altar – often within the chancel – and were integrated into the church building structure, often as recessed niches. Their development in England dates from the early 12th century, with their peak around mid-13th to mid-14th century. Elsewhere in Europe, sedilia were more often freestanding and made of wood. As moveable objects, their location and orientation within the church building did not carry the same symbolic importance as they did for English sedilia. Generally, European examples were simpler in form.

== History ==
=== Origins and early examples ===
Sedilia first appeared in the Romanesque period, usually as simple niches or stone benches. One of the most representative early examples is located in Kirkstall Abbey in West Yorkshire that was built in the end of the 1150s. This set includes a giant niche nearly 3 metres (9.8 ft) wide, and internal liturgical furnishings like piscina and credence shelf; it has decorative scalloped capitals and billet moulding. It demonstrates early sedilia as a one-piece structure on the presbytery wall.

These early patterns provide seats for the priest, deacon and subdeacon during the Mass. In this phase, sedilia were not just practical fixtures, their placement and decorative details had symbolic meaning in classifying clerical hierarchy. The form is rooted in Roman dado arcading, but extended beyond its functional nature and into a unique artistic form. From the middle 13th century to the 14th century, sedilia developed gabled forms, with sculptural elements and shrine-like canopies. They held symbolic meaning in Eucharistic theology and clerical hierarchy.

In the Decorated Gothic period from about 1250s to 1350s, sedilia underwent profound development. Their architectural detailing such as trefoil and quatrefoil spandrels, stiff-leaf foliage, and sculpted gables aligned with the trend of sacred space and visual complexity that Gothic architecture highlights. The sedilia of Kempsey, Worcester (1260s) and of Heckington are examples of the development in this style.

The development of sedilia was impacted by sponsorship. Wealthy clerical and lay patrons would individualise sedilia to their liturgical and aesthetic preferences. In churches of higher status like collegiate or minster churches, sedilia were often embedded into the old chancel structure to further highlight its liturgical and symbolic significance.

=== Decline and the Reformation ===
In the late flourishing of Perpendicular Gothic from 14th century to 16th century, the popularity of sedilia gradually declined. Architectural styles with unified surfaces on a large scale, with perpendicular elements were preferred in this period. These stylistic forms were in conflict with the sedilia styles of small scales and compartmentalisation. Sedilia in new churches in this period are rare; existing sedilia would be covered or removed, replaced with funerary monuments or wainscoting. After the Reformation, the decline escalated. Many sedilia were destroyed, painted or changed for other functions, but a significant number of them were restored thanks to their structural unity. In extremely rare situations like Wymondham Abbey, the sedilia were restored or newly built after the Reformation, which was possibly due to continuous Catholic sympathies or conservative leadership.

=== Revival in the 19th century ===
Sedilia saw a renaissance in the 19th century, at the peak of the Gothic period in England. In the Gothic Revival movement in the 19th century, sedilia were valued and rejuvenated, mainly thanks to the advocacy of ecclesia like the Cambridge Camden Society. Affected by architects and theorists like A. W. N. Pugin, many repairers and church constructors managed to repair the liturgical structures in the Middle Ages, including new sedilia. In many cases, restorers in Victorian even "corrected" and filled up the seats, or enforced their decorations to match the medieval styles in their minds. However, this revival also received some criticism. Some appreciated the return of medieval aesthetics and symbols, while others criticized the actions that adding up fake medieval elements into the churches without historical references. Even so, until the end of the 19th century, sedilia has reassured its status as one of the standard components of Anglican chancel design.

=== Legacy and scholarship ===
Nowadays, sedilia have continued to attract academic attention and been valued as the artistic production of liturgies, architecture and aesthetics. Scholar James Alexander Cameron proposed that sedilia are not only practical components, but also should be valued as a genre of ecclesiastical art with pattern consistency and regional variation. From the early single-niche pattern at Kirkstall to the elaborately sculptured sedilia at Belgrave and Heckington churches, the existing various of sedilia both present the medieval sculptors' creativity, and demonstrate the long-lasting symbolic meaning of the priestly seat in British ecclesiastical convention.

== Three seats ==
During certain sections of the liturgy, especially the gloria and credo, the clergy sat in the three-seater, also known as the Levite's seat, bench, or celebrant's chair when Mass was celebrated with the roles of priest, deacon, and subdeacon. These three seats, known collectively as the sedilia, are typically arranged side by side and recessed into the south wall of the chancel. They reflect the clerical hierarchy, with the priest occupying the highest and easternmost seat. Since the Second Vatican Council, the roles of deacon and subdeacon have been retained in the extraordinary form of the Roman Rite, as outlined in the 1962 Roman Missal.

== Symbolism and meaning ==
Although sedilia were primarily designed for practical demands in Mass, in the whole medieval development, it carried multiple symbolism and theological meanings. These archaeological components usually are a set of three seats in the chancel for the priest, deacon and subdeacon, which reflects both clerical hierarchy and significant visual symbolism of liturgical orders.

English sedilia is gradually evolving from the primary and simple wall to structured and decorated architecture combination, which visually highlights clerical hierarchy of priest, deacon, and subdeacon. This direction arrangement is stepped from east to the west, with both utility and symbolic meaning, which brings the hierarchy into the chancel architecture with ecclesiastical order. Cameron argues that sedilia presents the preference of British artistic symmetry and recessed ornament, whose standard appearance may also carry some symbolic meaning through visual rhymes and similarity. The sedilia tends to be placed near the altar, integrating with dado arcading as one, reflecting a kind of ritual architectural language bringing a sense of sanctity and order. In many churches, the sadilia is the most delicate and magnificent part, showing its significance in rituals.

Further evidence is provided for sadilia's symbolic functions with explanation of the painted art at Westminster Abbey. He pointed out that the figures in the Robert de Lisle Psalter are seemingly get impressed and influenced by the painted sedilia at Westminster, particularly in gestures, clothing and symbolic positioning. This performs that sedilia is not only a liturgical role, but also a visual patterns in religious authority and sincerity.

The appearance of decorations of sedilia further emphasized its symbolism. After the mid-13th century, triangular gables and structures like aedicules were used above the seats, which allowed the internal space of the churches to have significant micro architectural features. These elements highlighted the sacredness of the space around the clergy, visually deepening the idea of the chancel as a heavenly symbolized space. As Cameron proposed, these forms align with shrines, or reliquary-style architecture, transferring sedilia from pure seats to "tours de force of display", meanwhile evoking the imagination of salvation and Heavenly Jerusalem.

The evolution of symbolic meaning was closely related to the changing development of theology, in particular to the emphasis on the doctrine of Real Presence in the Eucharist. The easternmost seat symbolizes the role of Christ, making up the whole sedilia structure as the demonstration of sacramental authority. Cameron pointed out that in some cases, canopies or gables directly placed above the celebrant's seat are similar to altarpieces or reliquaries, making this seat itself equipped with a status as if a shrine.

Sedilia are often embedded into the southern wall of the altar, as well as conveyed more profound spiritual meanings. Inside the churches symbolic geography, the southern part of the altar would be related to lights and authorities. This position elevated the sacred identity of the clergy who were seated beyond them. The common stepped design of sedilia, where the seats descend from east to west, further demonstrates the spatial higher and lower hierarchicy.

Sedilia seldom appeared in figurative iconography, but its architectural forms often interacted with the more extensive visual aspects of churches. For example, at Heckington in Lincolnshire, sedilia were grouped into a sculptural system that includes the saints and canopy figures, allowing the clergy seated below to theologically and visually align with the celestial community above. It further intensified the clergy as the intermediaries between the earth and the divine.

The aesthetic treatment of sedilia also follows the change of liturgies and artistic styles. Since the mid-13th century, the Rayonnant style preferred by Paris, France with delicacy, magnificence and small-scale have influenced the English sedilia designs. According to Camron's analysis, the chase of micro-architectural complexity did not wrongly conceptualize liturgical furniture, especially objects related to sedilia, where they were not deemed as purely practical tools, but as theological components participating in the construction of sacred Mass dramas.

== Comparative sedilia styles ==
The classical English triple sedilia with each arched seat equipped with individual frameworks design, is rare in mainland Europe. Such integral seats appeared at the end of the 12th century, originally as simple niches like Kirkstall Abbey, later evolving as delicate and elaborate micro-architectural features in the Gothic ages. In contrast, churches in Europe tend to offer movable wooden chairs or benches for officiating clergy without the same deeply integrated presentation. In Europe, the forms, location and symbolic meanings of sedilia are different.

In England, the classical sedilia is three stone niches in the south wall of the church. The arrangement was especially favoured between the 13th and 14th centuries; distinctively, in English parish churches this was the standard. The sedilia is not only functional, but also a part of the church building. English sedilia lack ergonomic elements like armrests and back supports enjoyed by thrones and stalls. Its holy and functional expressions rely more on architectural vocabulary like arches, gables and moulding. The sedilia is always located to the south of the altar, the Epistle side (liturgical south); this is rooted in tradition both symbolically and liturgically. Piscinae for baptism are often located to the liturgical south, but may be placed anywhere in the church. This difference reflects the sedilia's distinctive status in English settings.

In contrast, sedilia in Europe is simpler and more flexible, usually seen as a moveable wood seat and a single niche. Some sedilia were stone and wood armchairs. For example, in Johanneskirche, Germany, there is a wooden sedilia with carved figurative elements created in the early 14th century, and in Boppard and Ennetach, a cubicle-like wooden sedilia influenced by the Florid Gothic style. The seating is usually independent of the church structure and close to the form of furniture rather than architecture, reflecting flexible liturgical arrangement.

In England, sedilia styles differ by church types. In great churches like Westminster Abbey, wooden sedilia take the lead, as the aisle chancels without adjacent walls are adopted. While in parish churches, embedded stone is the common format. The style is consistent with blind dado arcading in the great churches. Although there are few wooden sedilia in England parishes, some evidence from the 15th century shows that the sedilia was designed for simple and practical purpose without stone materials, like in Sheffield Cathedral and Much Hadham.

The architectural diversity of sedilia in English churches are seen in many surviving examples. These include ones at Chatham, Tilty and Rochester, their restoration preserving the diversity of features, ornament, materials and associated piscinae. Considered particularly fine examples are the sedilia at St. Andrew's Church, Heckington (1320s) and All Saints' Church, Hawton (1330s).

== Function, location and types ==
The location of the three seats is the south wall (at the "Epistle side", to the right of the altar, viewed from the liturgical west) of the chancel near the high altar. Here the oldest, niche-shaped three seats made of stone in the bond of the chancel wall are still preserved. In later examples, the turret architecture of the canopies above the seats takes on a life of their own. From the 14th century onwards, it was predominantly wooden furniture whose constructions formally approximate those of the choir stalls with their side walls, rear walls and roofing. But in contrast to these, three-seaters usually have no row of desks and no folding seats. In rare cases, three seats were not erected as Levite chairs for the liturgical actors, but rather as seats of honor and are then more likely to be found at the western end of the chancel.

== Examples ==
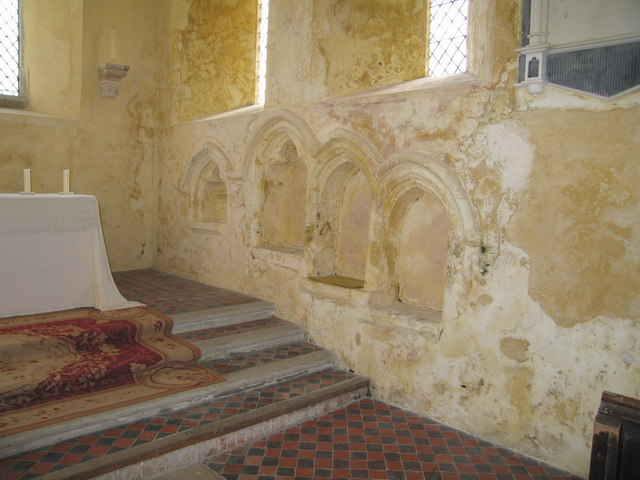
13th-century early English piscina and sedilia, St. Mary's, North Stoke, West Sussex

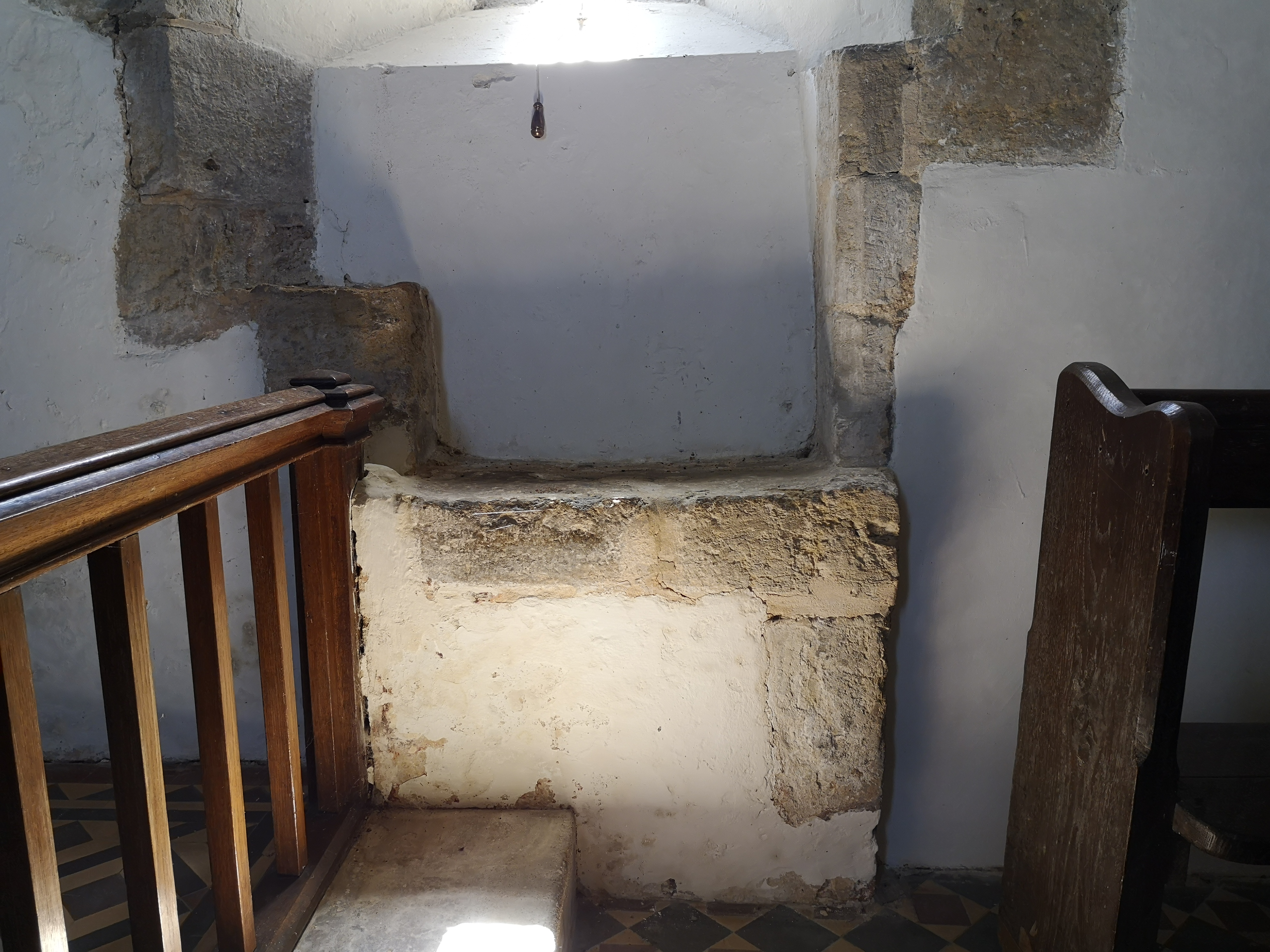
12th-century sedile at Coates, West Sussex

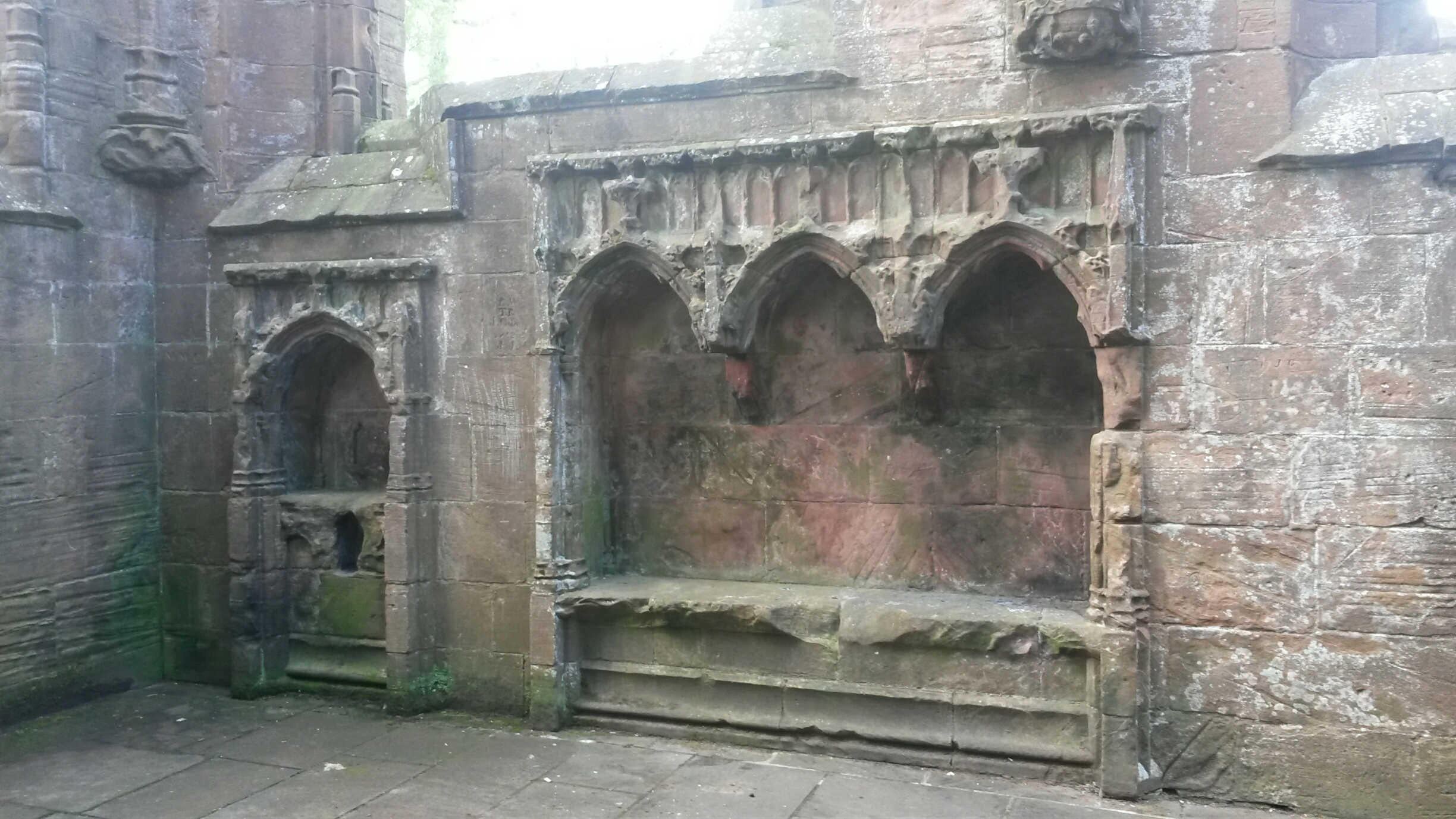
15th-century piscina and sedilia, Lincluden Collegiate Church, Dumfries and Galloway

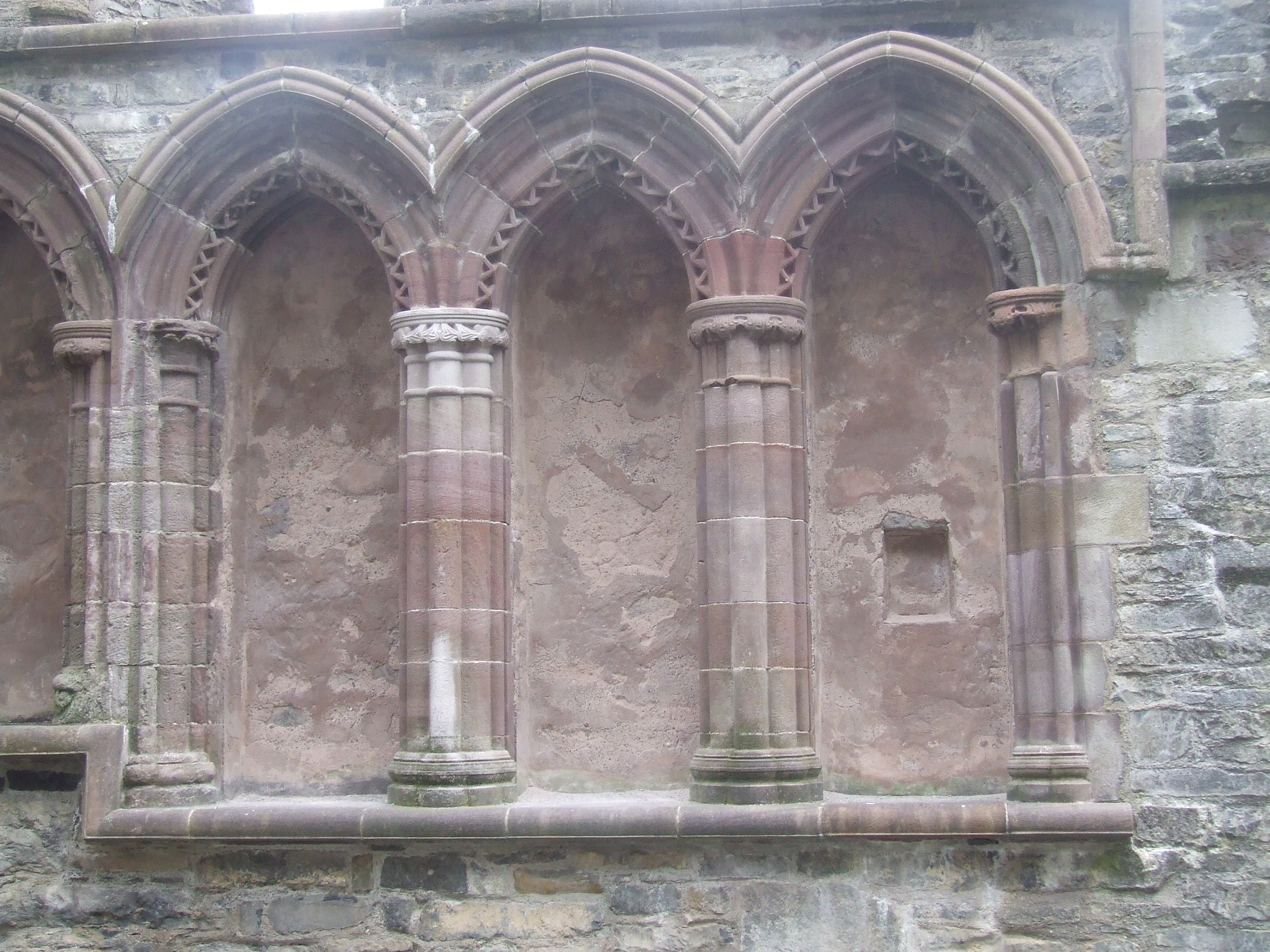
Sedilia at Ardfert Cathedral, County Kerry

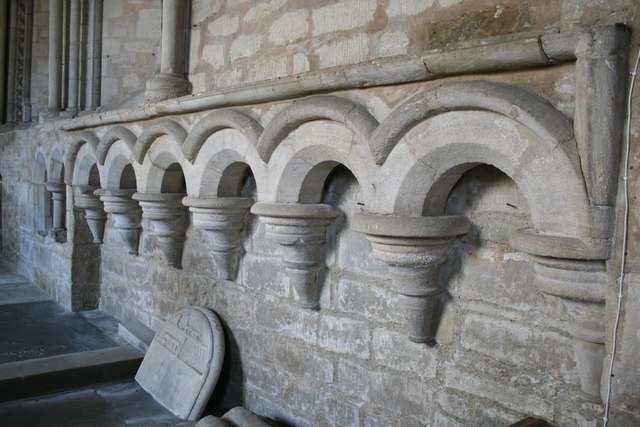
A six-seater sedilia of c1200 in the Priory church of Deeping St James, Lincolnshire

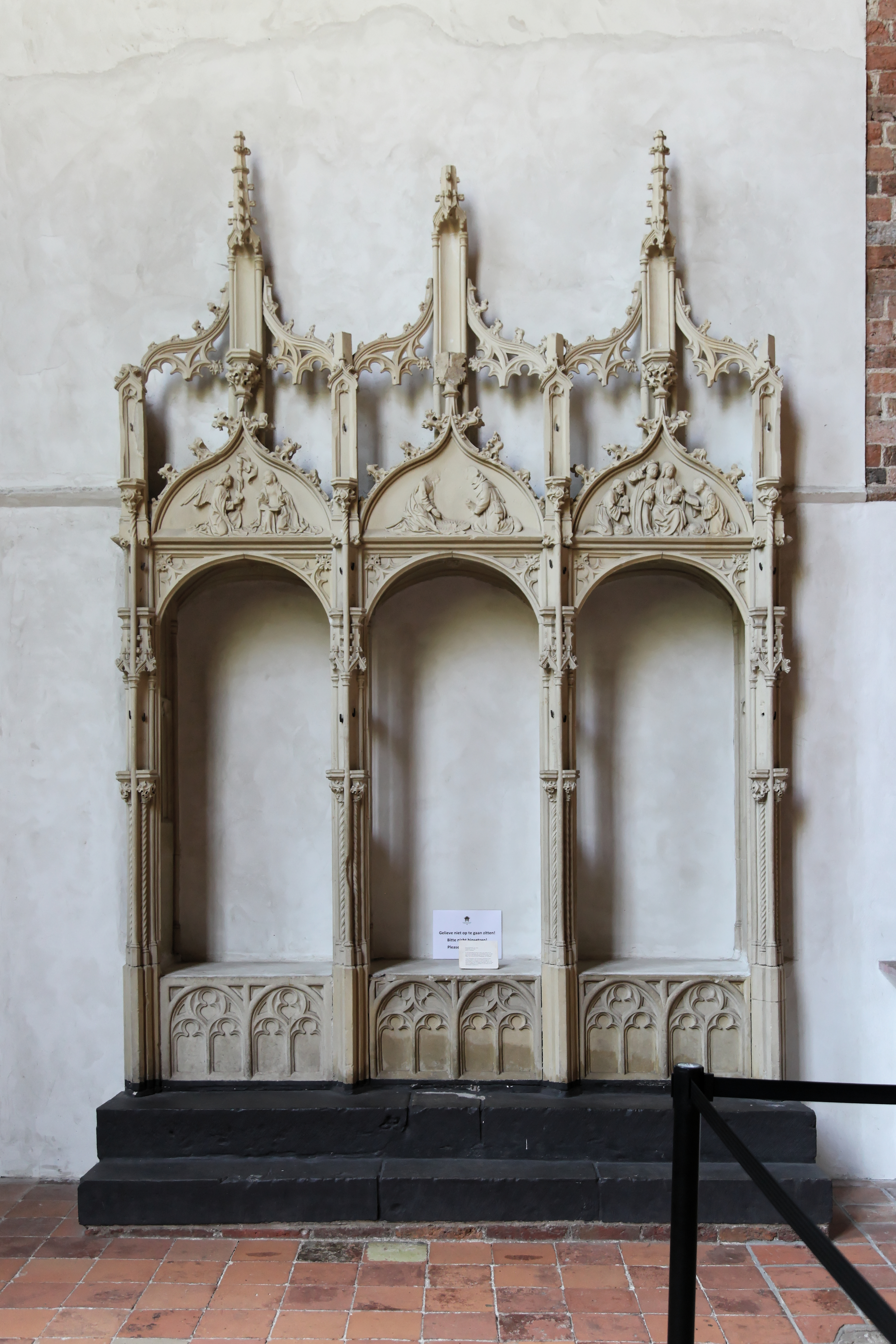
Sedilia in the Canons' church, Klooster Ter Apel, Boslaan in Ter Apel, Netherlands

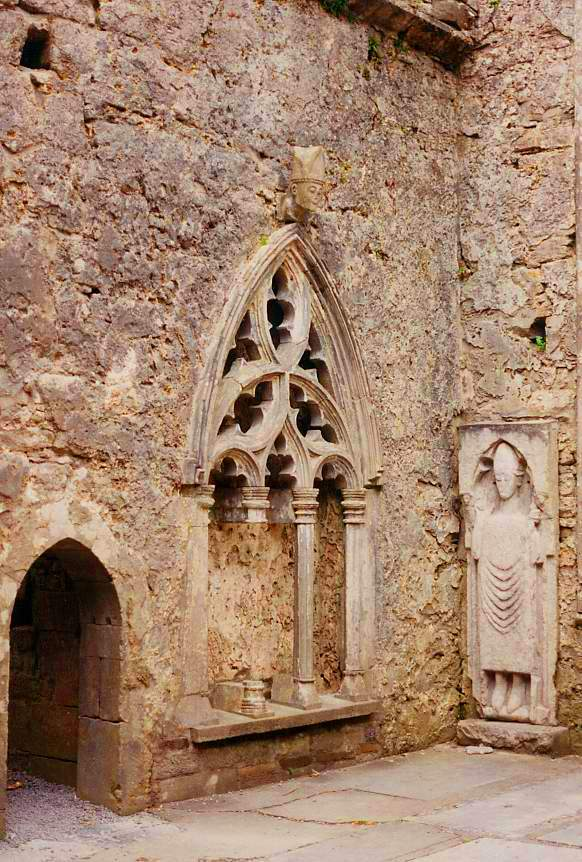
Gothic sedilia in the chancel of Kilfenora Cathedral, County Clare

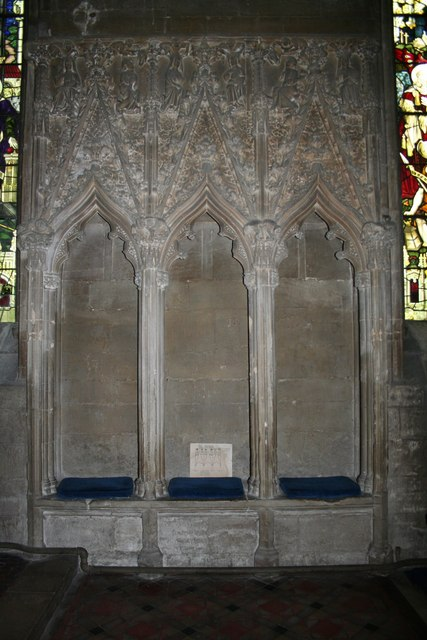
14th-century sedilia at Heckington, Lincolnshire

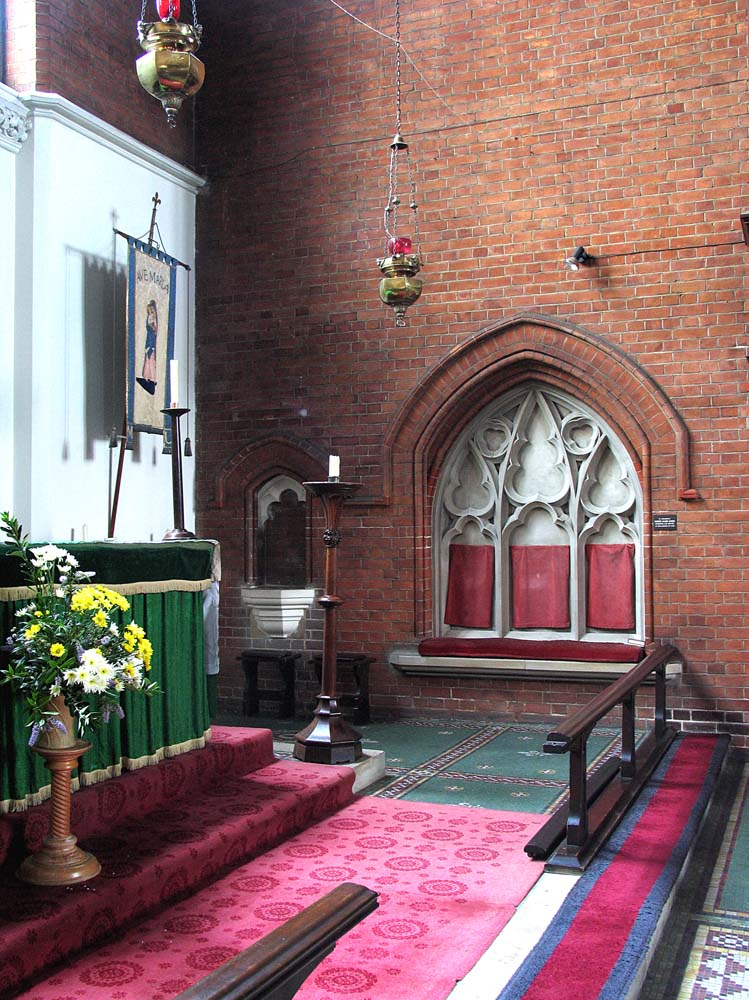
Early 20th-century sedilia, St Mellitus Church, Hanwell, London W7

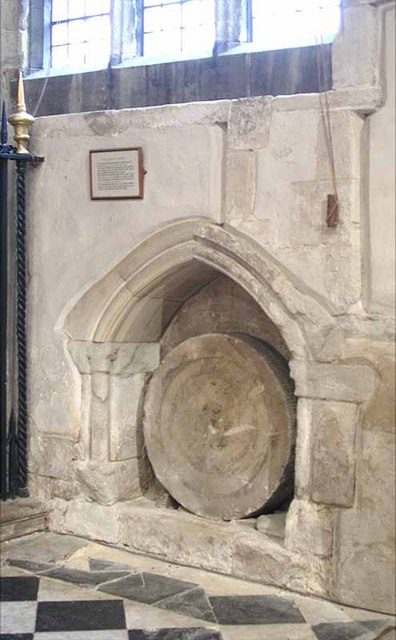
15th-century Gothic sedile, St Mary's, Bletchingley

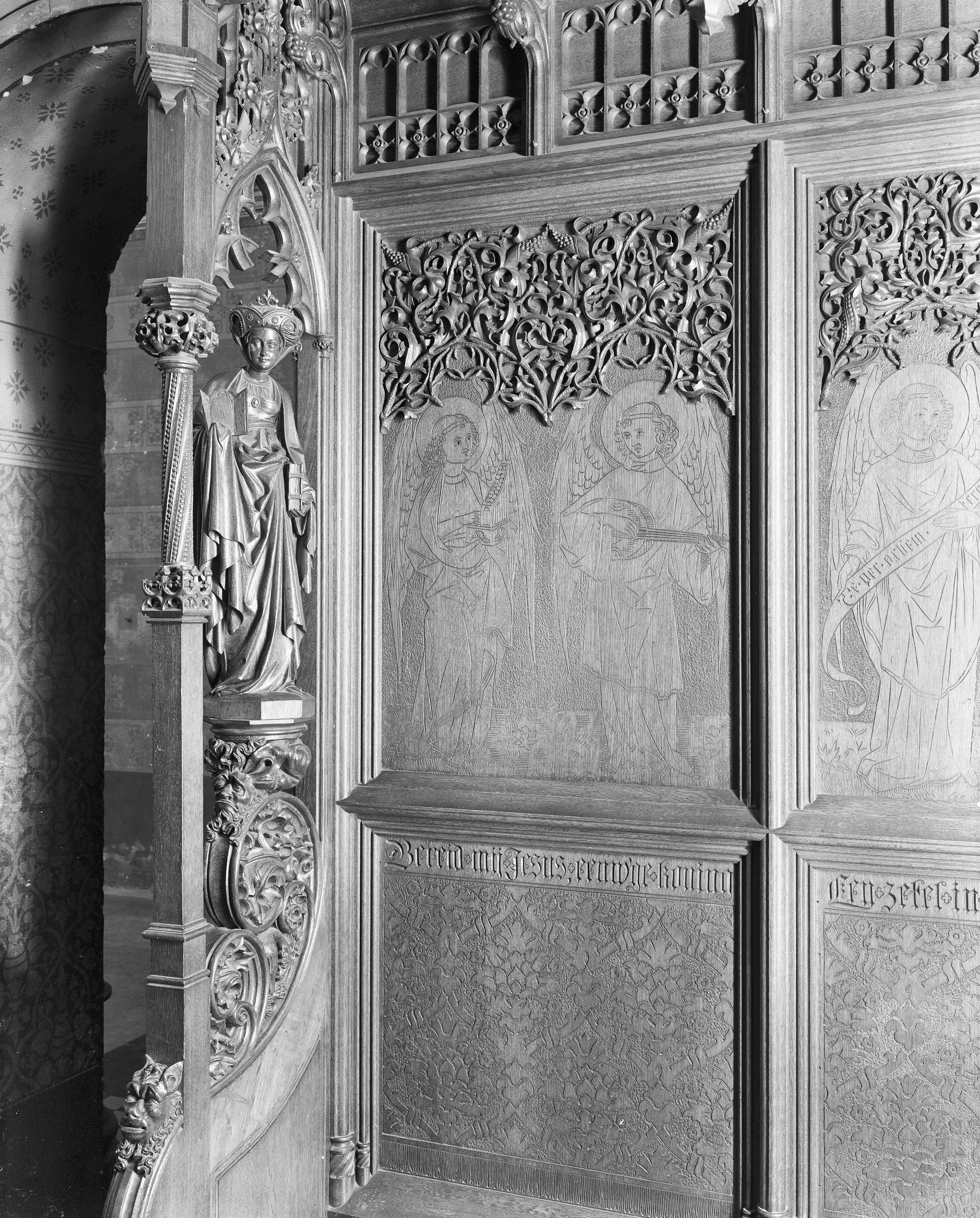
An ornately carved panel on sedilia at St. Willibrord's Church, Utrecht

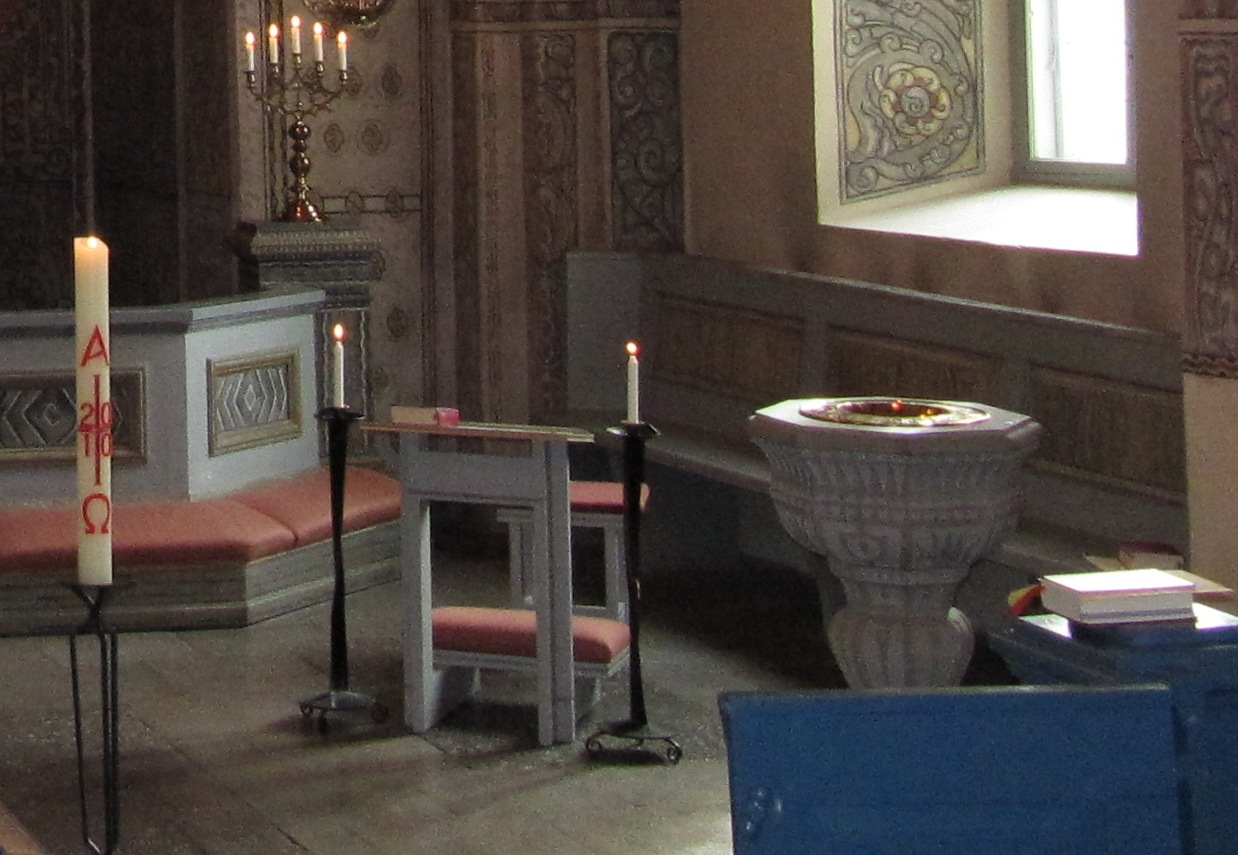
Free-standing sedile or chair with desk in Alsike Kyrka, Knivsta, Sweden

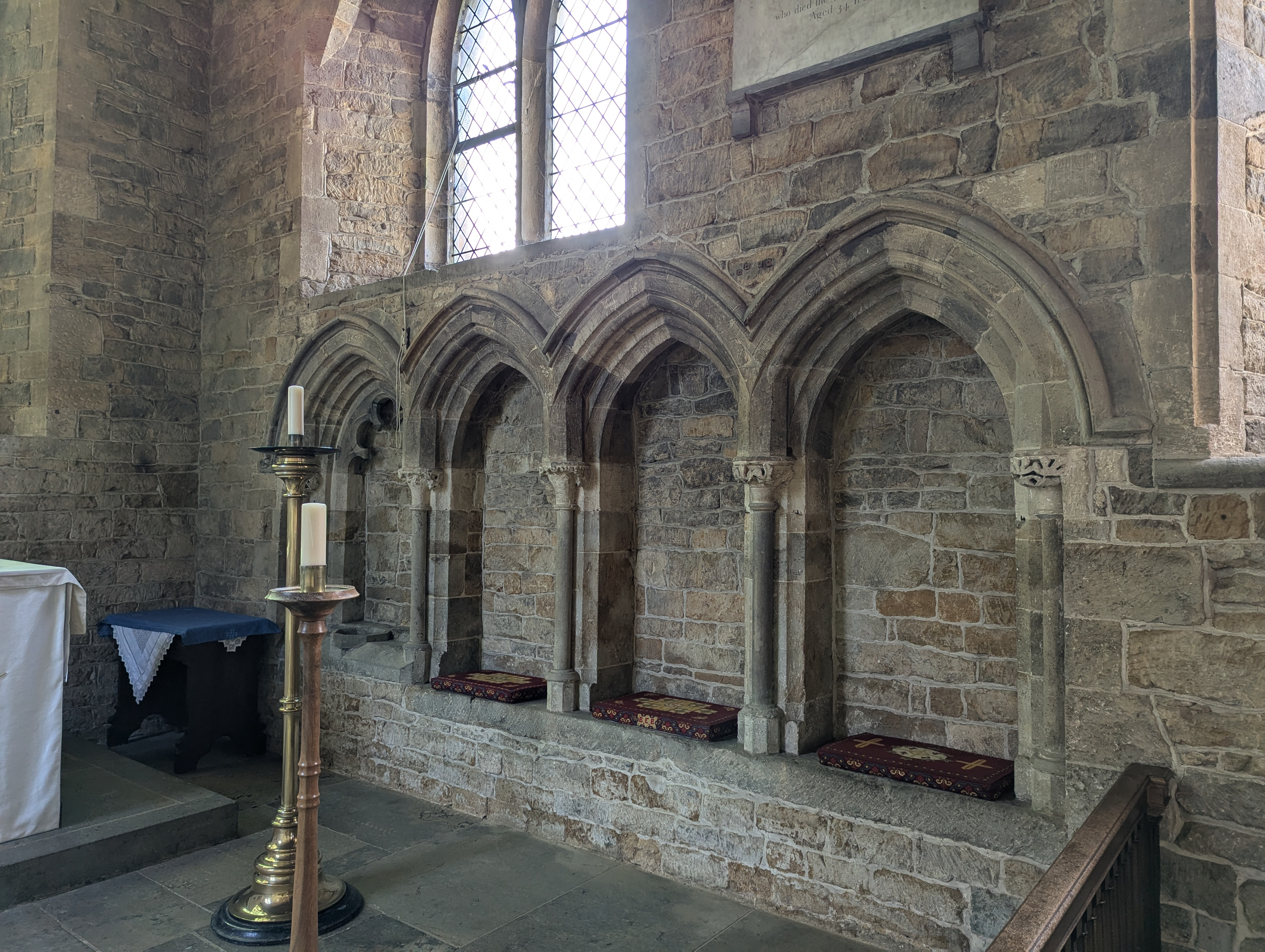
C13 stone piscina and sedilia, in the church of St. Peter and Paul, Deddington, Oxfordshire, England.

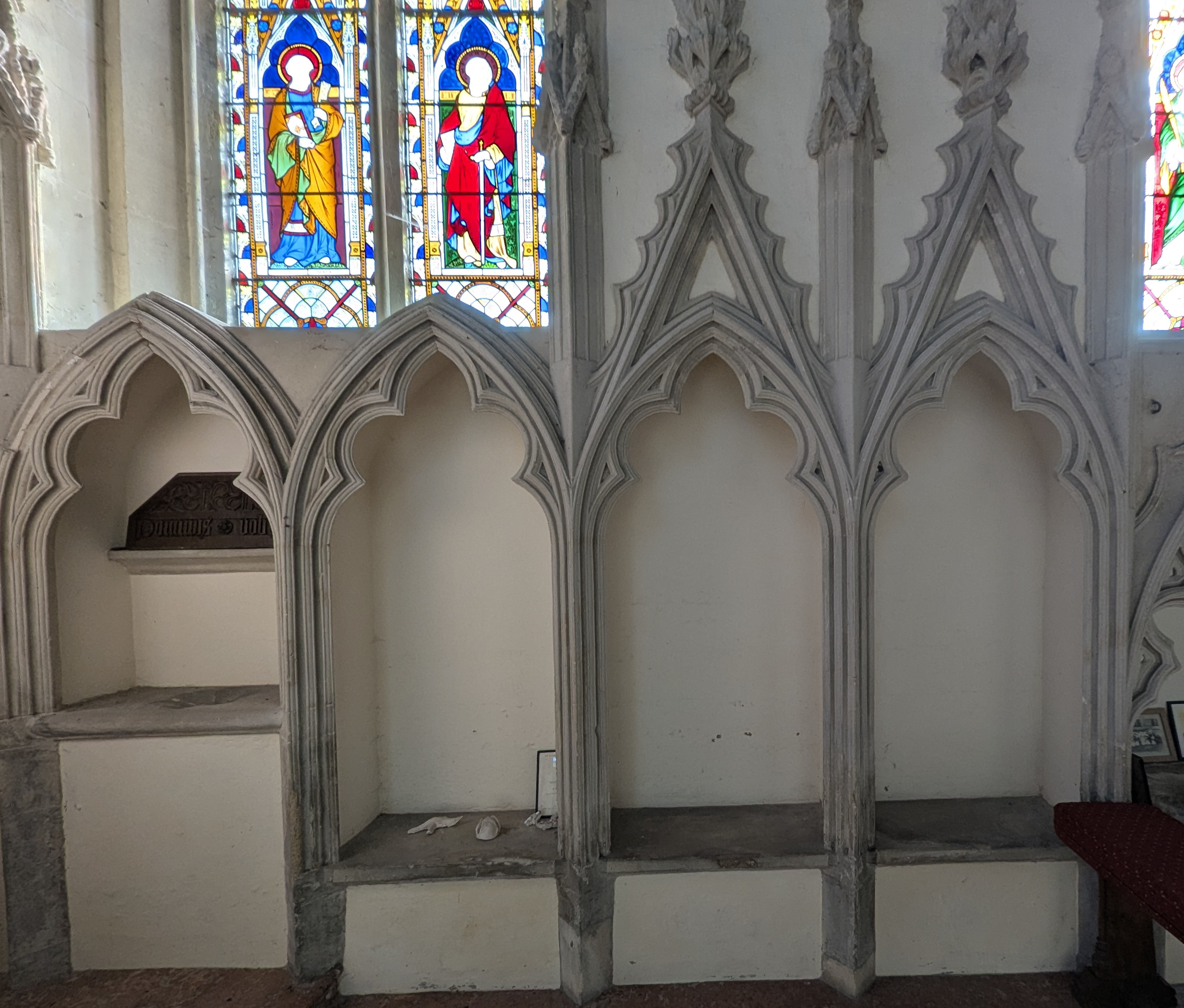
Piscine and sedilia in the St Peter's church at Great Haseley, Oxfordshire, England. March 2025.

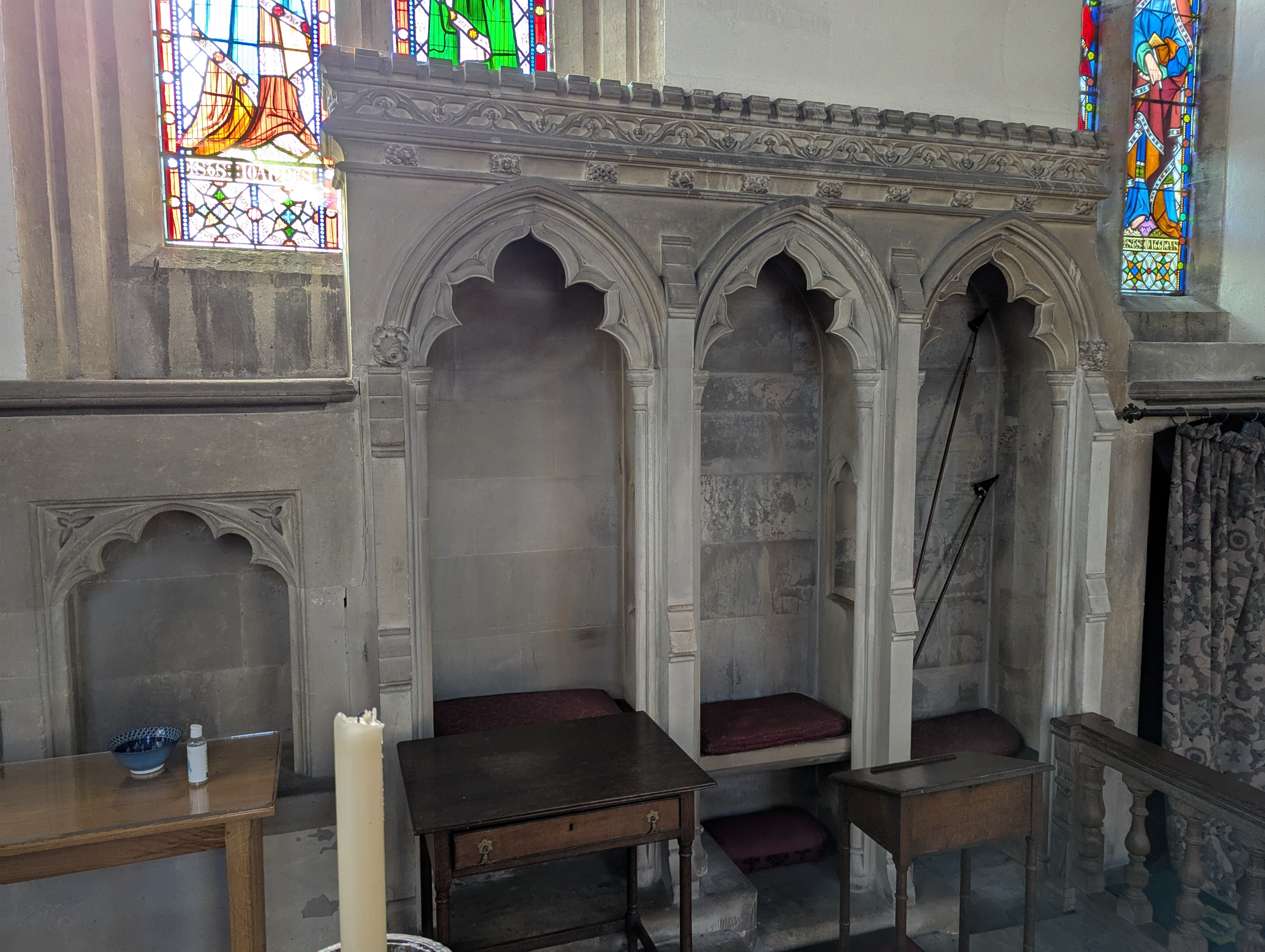
Piscine and stepped sedilia at the C13 church of St. Mary the Virgin, at Great Milton, Oxfordshire, England. March 2025.

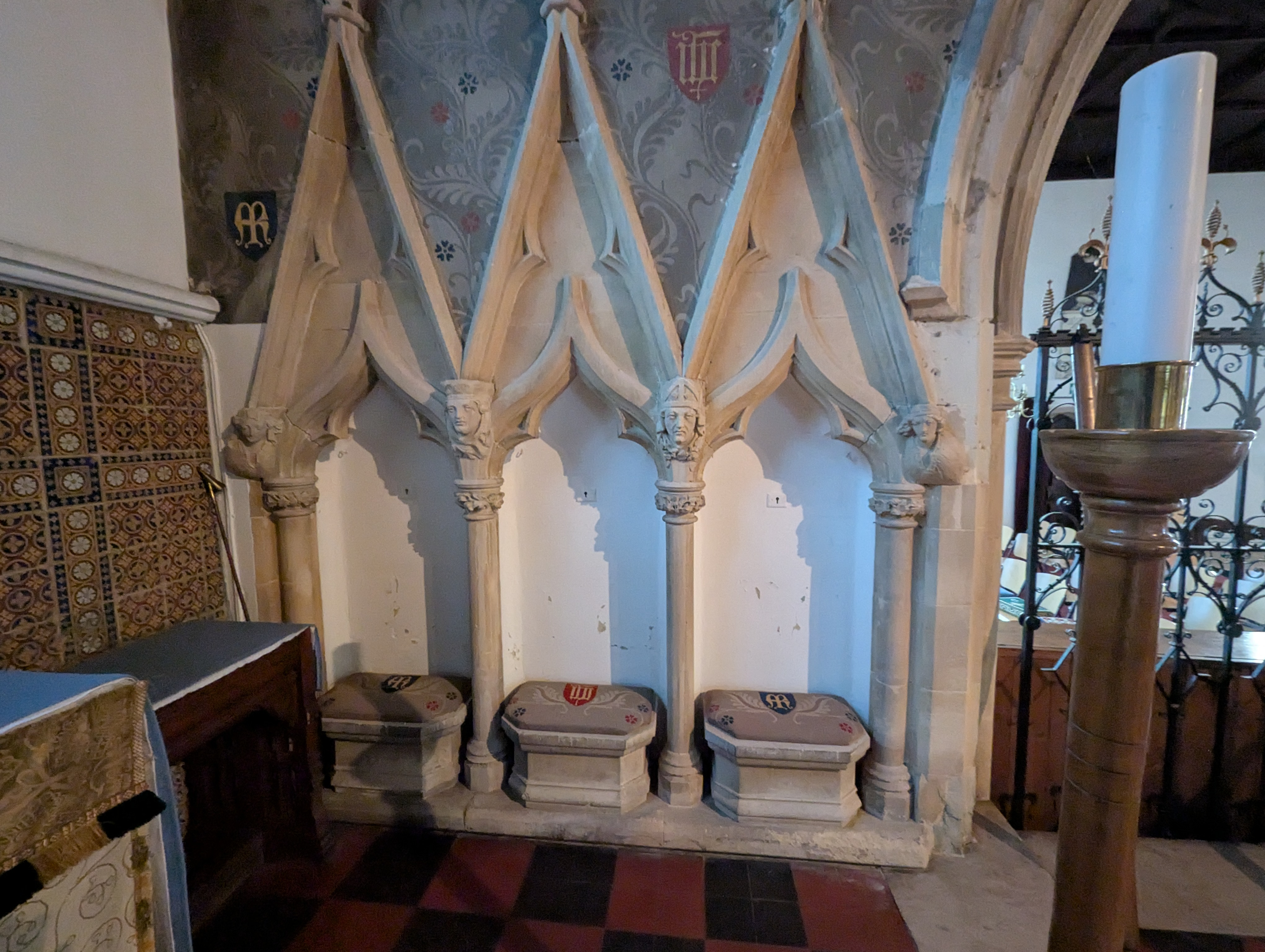
Sedilia in the south wall of the chancel at St. Mary the Virgin church at Henley On Thames, Oxfordshire, England. January 2025.

== Conservation and restoration ==
The conservation and restoration of sedilia have become an increasingly important issue of church heritage management. Although many of them are well restored, some of them have been badly damaged due to wear, structural alterations and poorly documented interventions.

=== Reformation and the dissolution of the monasteries ===
During the period, many sedilia have been repurposed, hidden or removed. Some churches in the later Middle Ages were rebuilt to add chapels, which tended to destroy the embedded sedilia in the 13th century.

In some cases, the upper part of sedilia was dismantled and the lower was reserved and added with wooden additions, like Upchurch in Kent. In other places, sedilia was added with doors to hide the stonework like in All Saints, Hereford. It shows the idea of viewing sedilia as redundancy after the 16th century.

=== Victorian period ===
During the Victoria period, the Gothic Revival activated people's new interest in sedilia to view it as a part of churches in medieval ecclesiastical architecture. Many architects like George Gilbert Scott have conducted wide repair to sedilia including Gloucester and Ripon. However, these efforts receive criticism. For example, in Gloucester Cathedral, Scott admitted that the repair had been done based on the existing evidence and his own judgement, which reveals the limitation of available documents at the time.

=== Modern conservation ===
The modern conservation aims to maintain the structural stability and the historical integrity. The current principle is to emphasize minimal intervention, reversibility and material compatibility. For example, in the early 19th century Roman cement was used to repair sedilia in Southwell Minster, which were revealed and repaired after being hidden behind oak screens for years.

At Beverley Minster, a notable set of wooden sedilia dating from the 1340s was subjected to unusual conservation treatment in the 19th century. In 1876, the seats were submerged in a tank to remove remaining traces of medieval paint—an invasive method that would not align with modern conservation ethics. Nevertheless, small traces of gilding survived, underscoring the fragility of original surfaces and the importance of careful handling. At Beverley Minster, a wooden sedilia built in 1340 had received unprecedented repairs in the 19th century. In 1876, the sedilia was soaked in water to remove the medieval paint. The invasive management is unaccepted at present.

At St Mary's Church, Ashwell, conservation programs between 2006 and 2015 include careful stone change, mortar re-pointing and restoration of the color glass. The sedilia and piscina on the south church wall were paid more attention (Martin, 2025). The programs dealt with weathering damage, glass stability and indoor dampness, taking the standard techniques of appropriate heritage, including limewash, phosphor bronze ferramenta and clush repairing. The programs show the current best practice in the field of heritage conservation.
