= Ratass Church =

- Teampall Ráth Teas
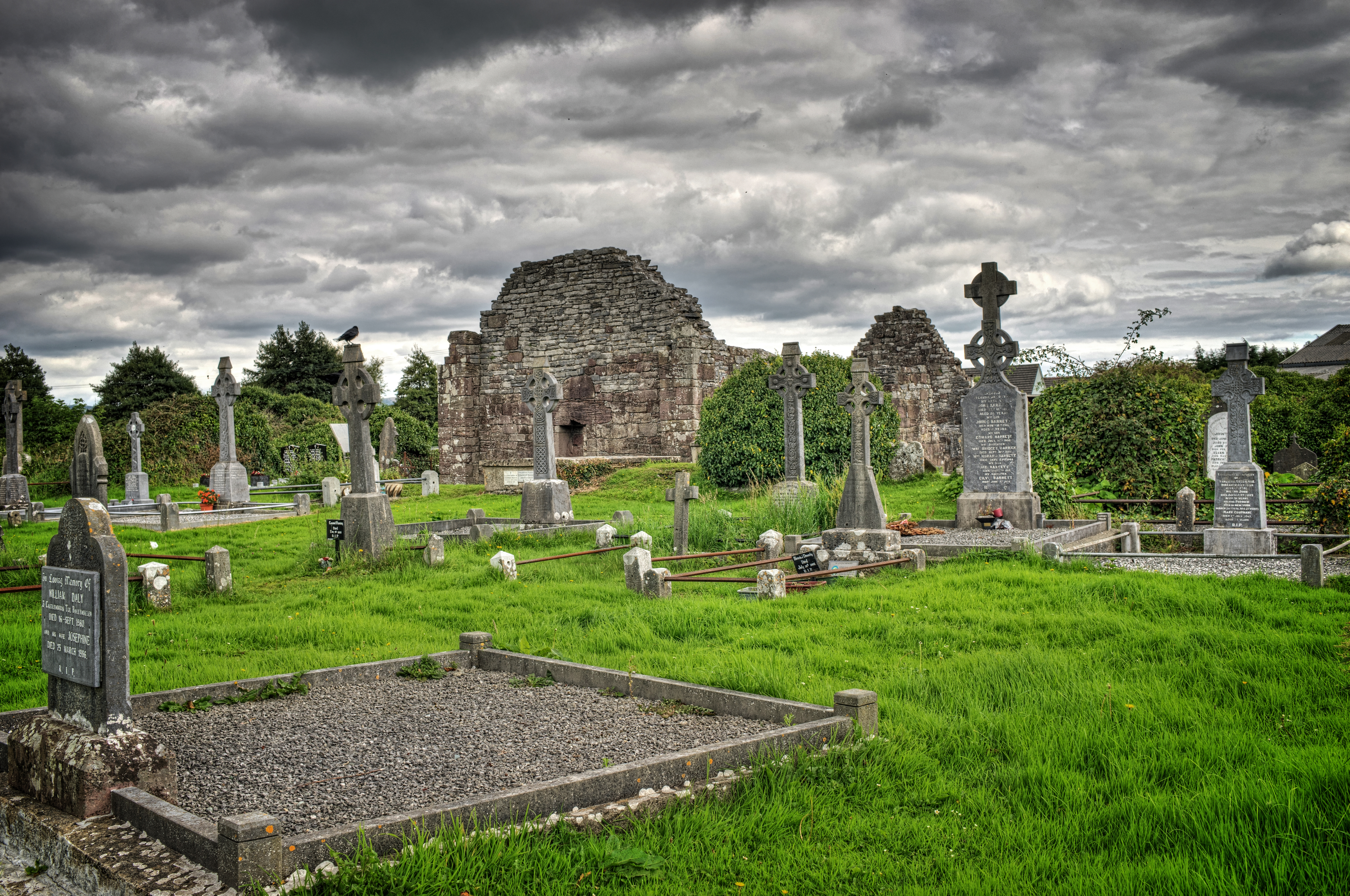
- Ratass Church

- Location within Ireland
- 52.267007°N 9.681814°W
- Location: Quill Street, Tralee, County Kerry
- Country: Ireland
- Denomination: Catholic (pre-Reformation)

Architecture
- Functional status: Ruined
- Style: Romanesque
- Years built: 10th century AD

Specifications
- Length: 16 m (52 ft)
- Width: 7.5 m (25 ft)
- Materials: Sandstone, limestone, mortar

Administration
- Diocese: Ardfert and Aghadoe

National monument of Ireland
- Official name: Ratass Church & Ogham Stone
- Reference no.: 57

Ratass Church is a medieval church with ogham stone inscriptions in Tralee, County Kerry, Ireland. It is a National Monument.

== Location ==
The church and adjacent graveyard are located on Quill Street, in the eastern suburbs of Tralee.

== History ==
It is believed that a ringfort or embanked enclosure was built here first (Rath Mhaighe Teas, "fort of the southern plain"). Later, a sandstone church was erected in the 10th century. It served as the episcopal seat of a diocese in Kerry from 1111 to 1117, when the seat was moved to Ardfert. The west gable and part of the nave walls belong to this earlier construction; the rest of the church is later.

== Ogham stone ==
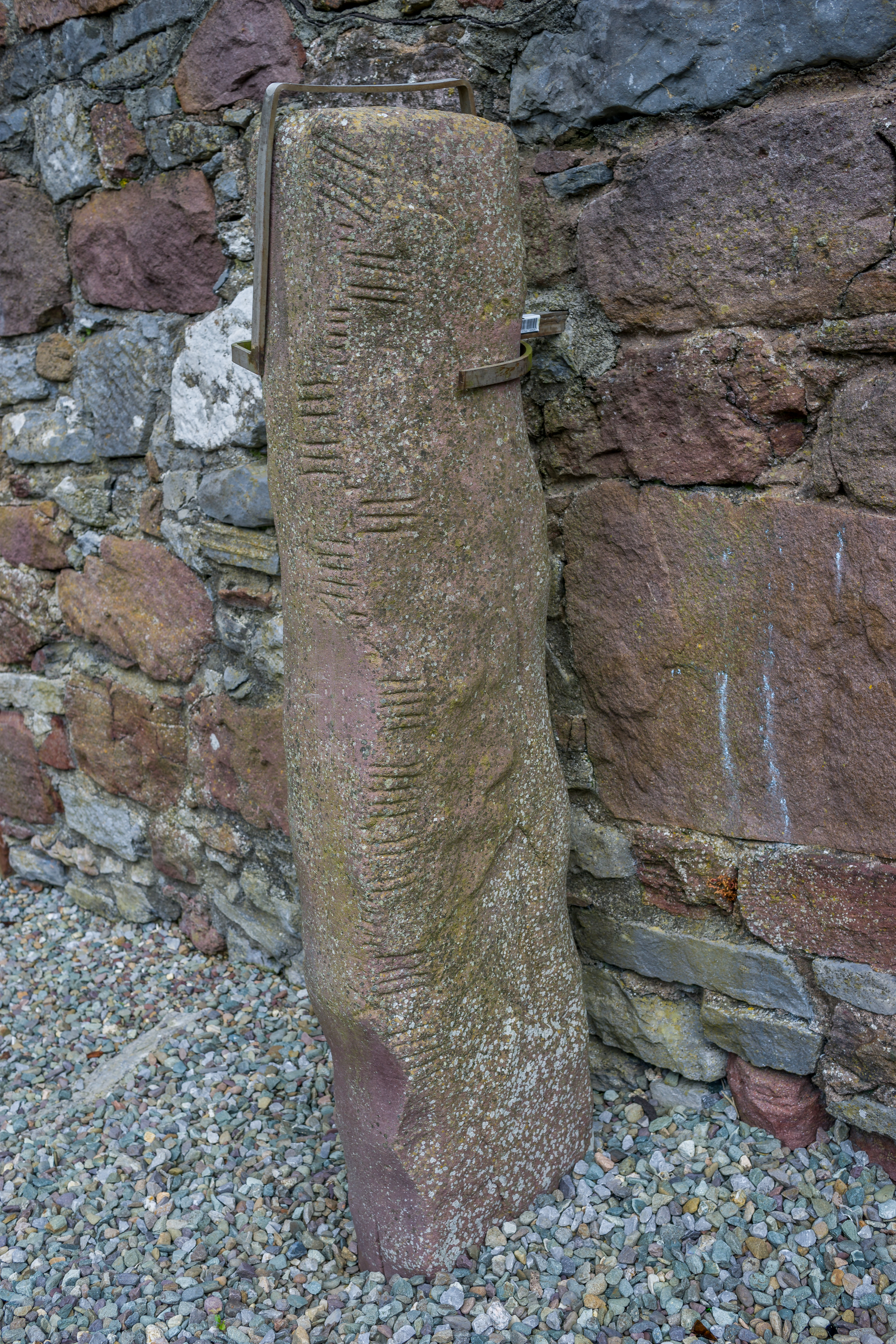
The ogham stone

The ogham stone is from much earlier. Based on its Primitive Irish grammar, the inscription is estimated to be from around AD 550–600.

The stone is of fine purple sandstone (145 × 34 × 20 cm), with the inscription "[A]NM SILLANN MAQ VATTILLOGG" ("name of Sílán son of Fáithloga"). It was discovered in 1975 during a cleanup. The walls of a 19th-century burial vault had been built almost flush with it.
