= St. Andrew's Church, Heckington =

Church in Lincolnshire

Coordinates: 52°58′56″N 0°17′57″W

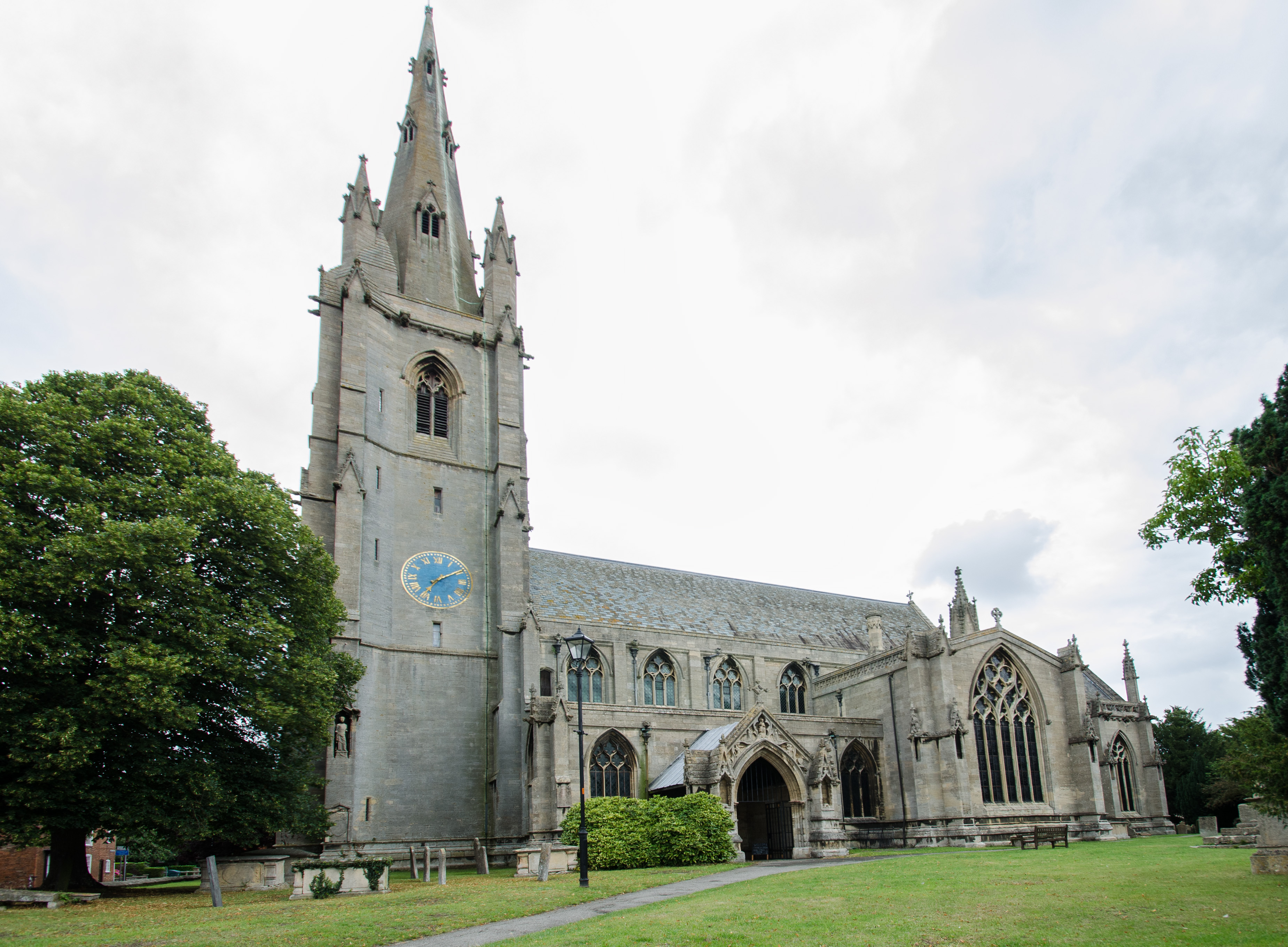
St. Andrew's Church Exterior

St. Andrew's Church, located in Heckington, Lincolnshire, England, began construction around 1307 in a cruciform plan and a decorated style. The Anglican Parish church measures 164 feet long and 180 feet tall at the spire. The church is made of Ancaster stone and features a clerestoried nave, aisles, and transepts. It is perhaps best known for its Easter sepulchre, intricate window tracery, and exterior carvings.

== History ==
St. Andrew's Church in Heckington replaced a previous church that was present as early as the 1190s.

The current church, dedicated to Saint Andrew, was founded in the early 14th century by Richard de Potesgrave, a Chaplain to King Edward II and later to King Edward III. King Edward II also appointed Henry de Beaumont to oversee the Heckington area and the construction of the church alongside Potesgrave. Potesgrave was the rector of St. Andrew's Church from 1307 to his death in the mid-late 1340s.

In 1345, the Church was acquired by Bardney Abbey.

Some features, like the North transept window, were replaced in the 1800s.

The church has been Grade I listed by Historic England since 1967.

== Sculpture ==
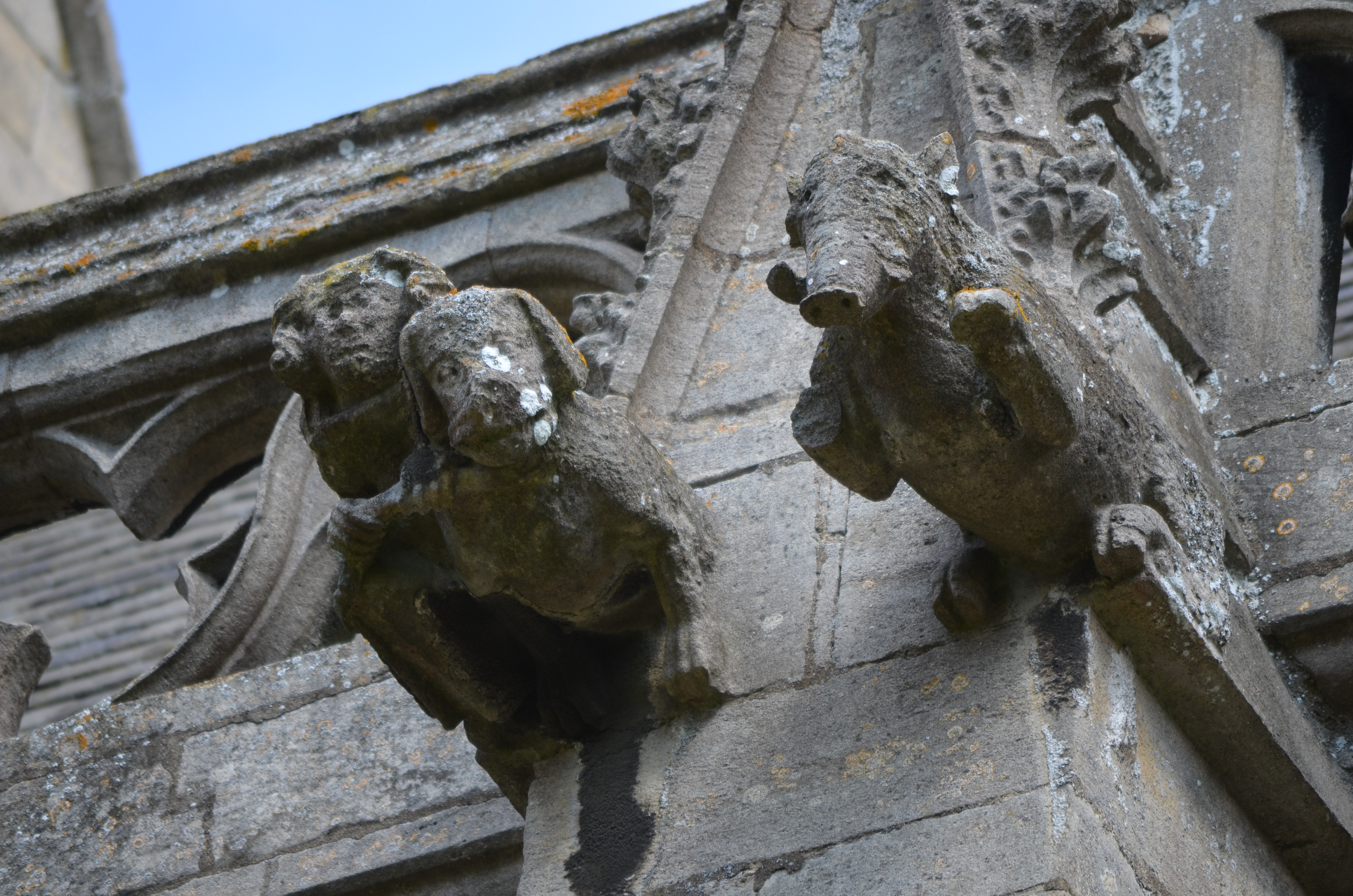
Gargoyles at St. Andrew's Church, Heckington

As an example of the decorated style, St. Andrew's exterior is heavily decorated with gargoyles in many distinct forms. These carvings depict a wide range of subjects, including people, mermaids, dogs, boars, demons, and angels.

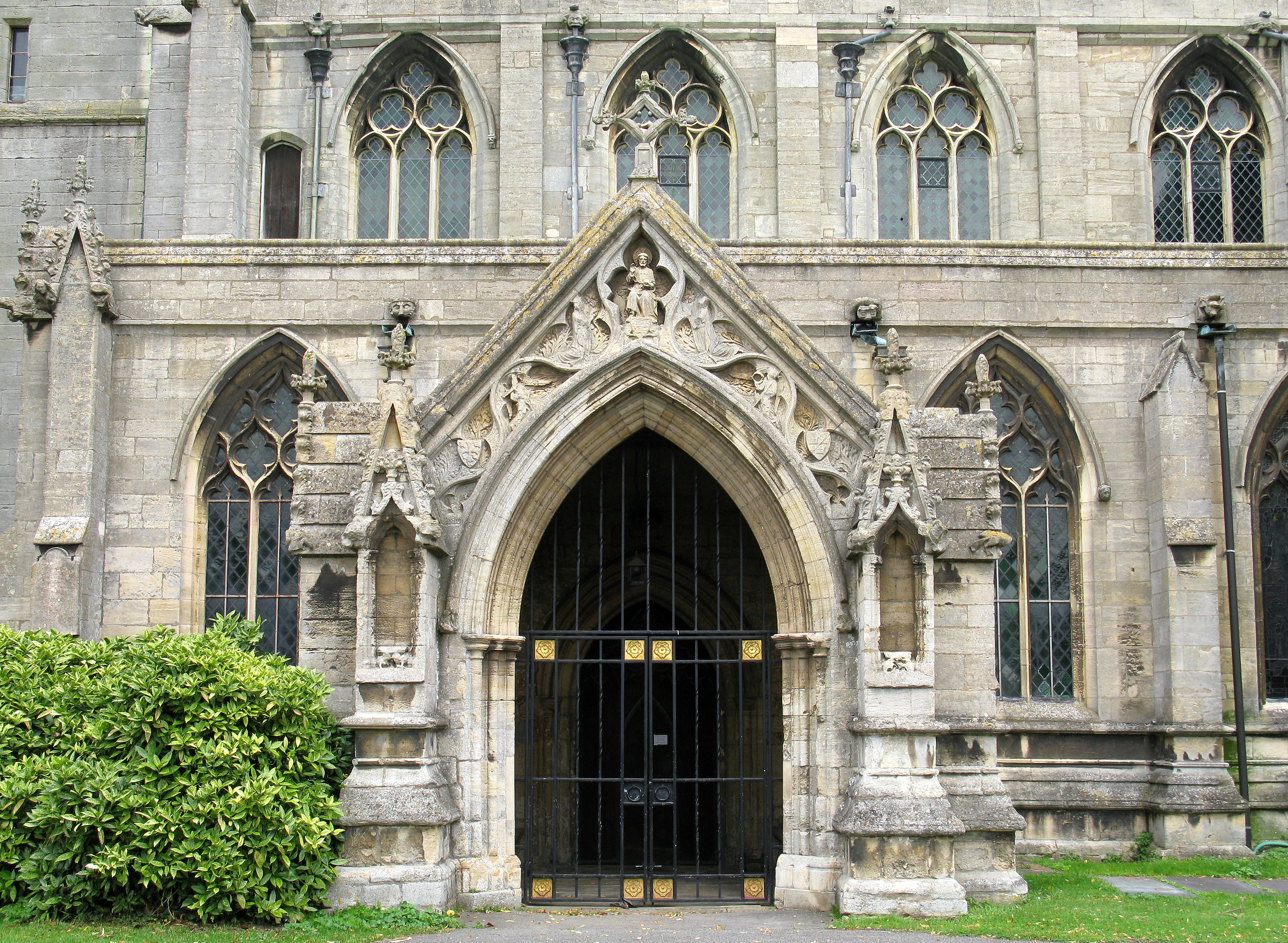
St. Andrew's Church, Heckington, Empty South Porch Niches

Theories suggest that these sculptural elements may satirize human sin or immorality. Mermaids and other apparently part-human forms may be references to Greek mythology, warning against pride or lust.

While much remains, some sculptural elements were defaced or destroyed over the centuries, likely by iconoclasts.

== Interior features ==
The chancel of St. Andrew's holds the church's most popular and notable features, including the Easter sepulchre, sedilia, and the tomb of Richard de Potesgrave.

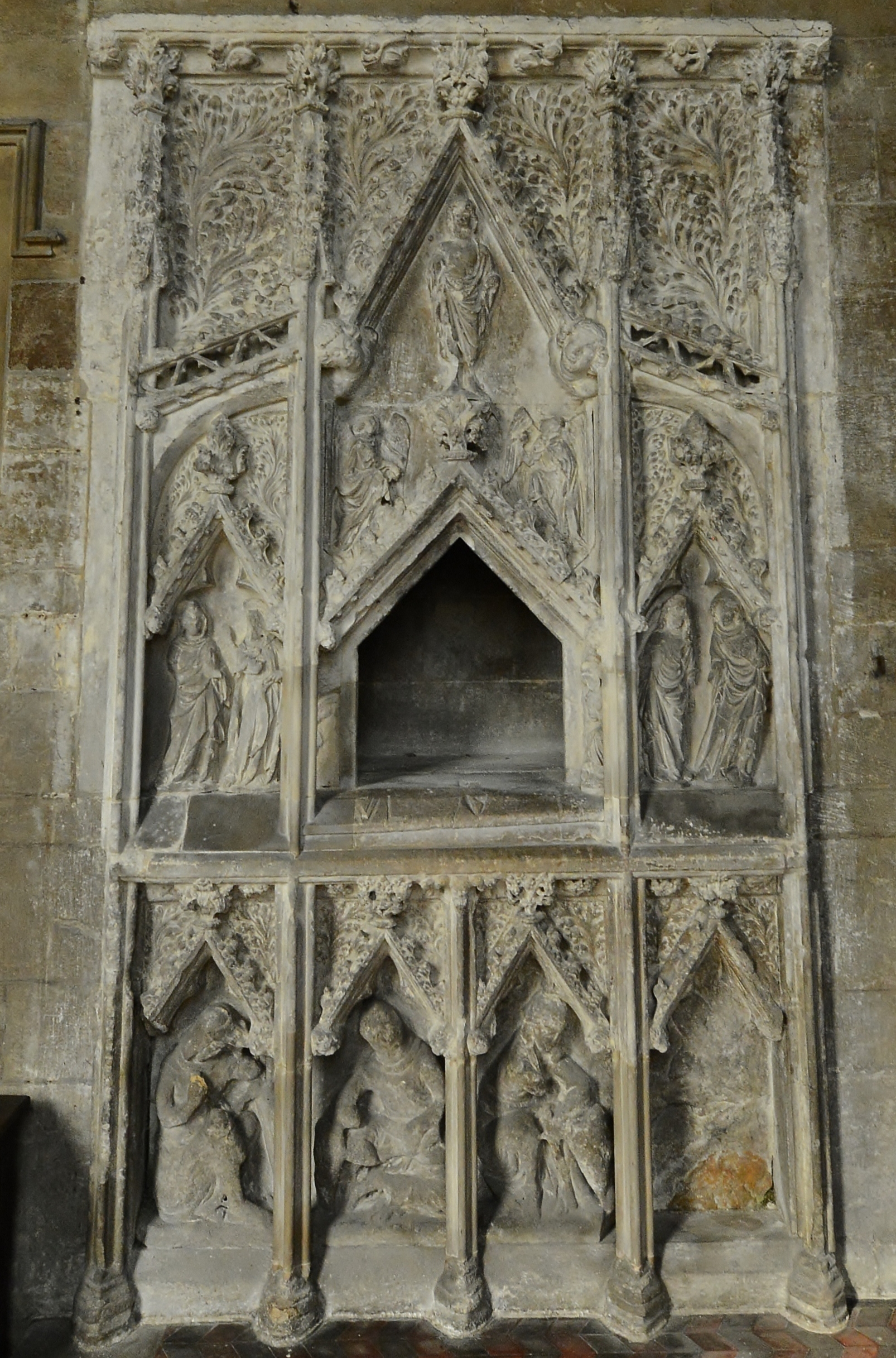
St. Andrew's Church Easter Sepulchre

=== Easter Sepulchre ===
The Easter sepulchre was made to hold a sacrament from Good Friday to Easter Sunday. This was part of a religious ritual symbolizing the entombment and later resurrection of Christ.

The sepulchre at Heckington is noted for its intricate sculptural detailing around a triangular arch opening.Four seated soldiers separated by buttresses decorate the bottom of the sepulchre. On either side of the opening and framed by shafts rising from the buttresses below are reliefs of the Three Marys and an angel. Depicted above the slopes of the opening are two more angels, and at the peak is the risen Christ.

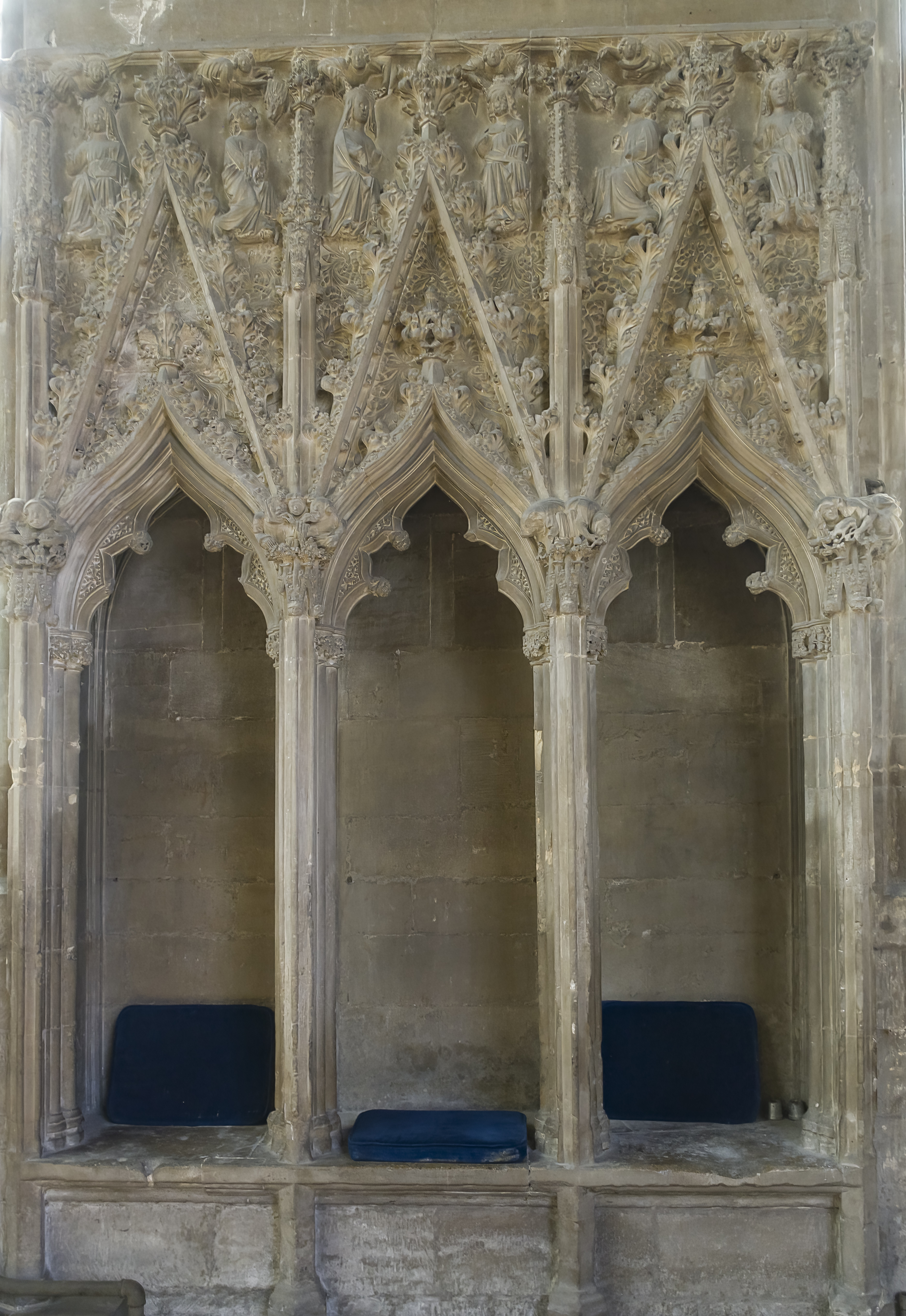
St. Andrew's Church Triple Sedilia

=== Sedilia ===
The church has a triple sedilia, made to seat three members of the clergy.

It is an inset area with buttress-shafts similar to the Easter sepulchre. It is heavily decorated above the canopy with six small reliefs. These depict Christ in Majesty and the Virgin Mary; with virgin martyrs alongside, St Katherine with wheel, and St Margaret, defeated dragon (demon) at her feet. Above each figure, sculpted angels hold crowns above their heads. A female acolyte is shown at each end.

=== Tomb of Richard de Potesgrave ===
Richard de Potesgrave was buried in the church in an inlaid tomb. The tomb features an effigy of Potesgrave in rich, draping garb. The sculpted face is largely destroyed, but the rest of the figure remains in good condition. A chalice found inside the tomb in 1800 is now on display above the effigy.

== Stained glass ==
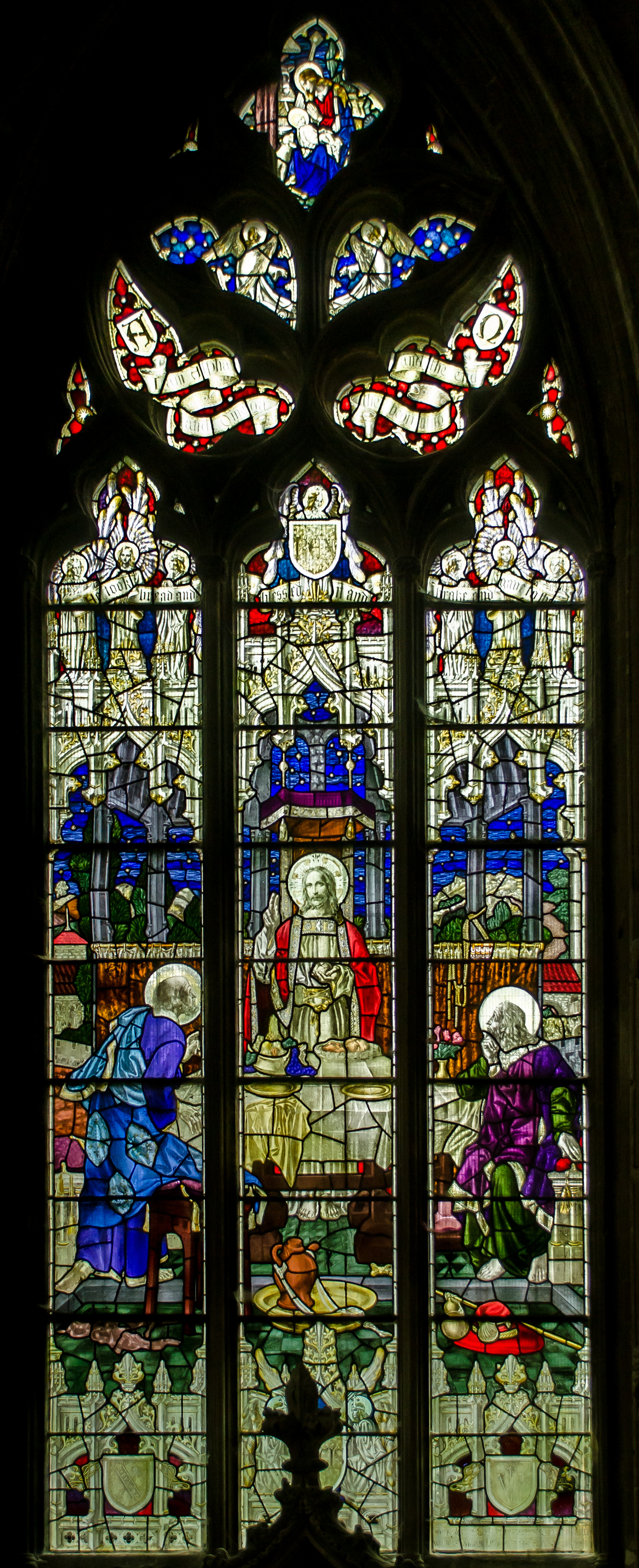
St. Andrew's Church, Heckington Stained Glass Window

While much has been replaced over the centuries, some medieval stained glass from the time of construction survives. According to Dr. Jim Cheshire of the University of Lincoln, only about 5% of all stained glass from the medieval period has survived to the present day.

While most windows depict religious scenes, some of the original stained glass is known to have featured the Beaumont family coat of arms.

About 500 original pieces of stained glass were taken from the west window of St. Andrew's Church for restoration in 1946. After decades of restoration efforts, the glass fragments were returned to St. Andrew's in January 2025.

Window decoration varies throughout the church, mixing reticulated tracery with trefoils and quatrefoils.
