= Bishop of Ardfert and Aghadoe =

The Bishop of Ardfert and Aghadoe (usually simply referred to as the Bishop of Ardfert) was an episcopal title which took its name after the village of Ardfert and townland of Aghadoe, both in County Kerry, Ireland.

== History ==
The diocese of Ráith Maighe Deiscirt was one of the twenty-four dioceses established at the Synod of Rathbreasail in 1111 and was co-extensive with the kingdom of Iarmuman; which consisted all of County Kerry and a small part of County Cork. The bishop's seat (Cathedra) was originally located at Rathass near Tralee, but by 1117, it had been moved to Ardfert Cathedral. At the Synod of Kells in 1152, the diocese lost some territory when the diocese of Scattery Island was established.

After the Reformation, there were parallel apostolic successions. In the Church of Ireland, the title continued until 1661 when it united with Limerick to form the bishopric of Limerick, Ardfert and Aghadoe. The Roman Catholic Church title continued until 1952 when it changed its name to the bishopric of Kerry.

== Pre-Reformation bishops ==
Pre-Reformation Bishops of Ardfert and Aghadoe
From	Until	Incumbent	Notes
unknown	1117	Anmchad O h-Anmchada	Died in office
bef. 1152	1161	Máel Brénainn Ua Rónáin	Called Bishop of Kerry at the Synod of Kells in 1152; died 21 September 1161
unknown	1193	Domnall O Connairche	Called Bishop of Iar Mumhan (West Munster); died in office
1197	1207	David Ua Duibdithrib	Called Bishop of Iar Mumhan (West Munster); elected before 1197; confirmed in 1200 or 1201; died in office
unknown	c.1217	(name not known)	Died in office
1217	1224	John, O.S.B.	Elected circa 1217; consecrated before 28 February 1218; acted as a suffragan bishop in the Diocese of Canterbury; deprived by the Papal legate 18 June 1224; died 14 October 1245
1218	1235	Gilbertus	Elected before 28 February 1218; confirmed after 16 July 1219; resigned after 24 April 1235
1236	1251	Brendán	Elected after 6 December 1236; confirmed 17 November 1237; resigned 1 August 1251; died before 20 April 1252
1253	1256	Christianus, O.P.	Elected before 23 February 1253; consecrated after 17 August 1253; died before 20 August 1256
1257	1264	Philippus	Elected before 25 March 1257; consecrated 1257; died before 4 July 1264
1265	1286	John	Elected before 3 March 1265; died before 6 June 1286
1286	1288	Nicolaus	Elected after 28 June 1286; died 14 March 1288
1288	1335	Nicol Ó Samradáin, O.Cist.	Elected after 26 April 1288; died 1335
1331		(Edmund of Caermarthen, O.P.)	Appointed and consecrated 24 September 1331, but did not get possession
1335	1347	Ailín Ó hEichtigihirn	Elected circa 1335; provided and consecrated 18 November 1336; died 2 December 1347
1348	1372	John de Valle	Elected before October 1348; provided 22 October 1348; died before October 1372
1372	c.1379	Cornelius Ó Tigernach, O.F.M.	Appointed 22 October 1372; died circa 1379
1380	c.1404	William Bull	Appointed in 1380; received temporalities from the king 14 February 1380; died circa 1404
1404	1405	Nicholas Ball	Appointed before October 1404, but did not take effect; translated to Emly 2 December 1405
1405		(Tomás Ó Ceallaigh, O.P.)	Appointed before 10 March 1405, but did not take effect; translated to Clonfert 11 March 1405
1405	1411	John Attilburgh, O.S.B.	Appointed 10 March 1405; confirmed by Antipope Alexander V 25 October 1409 (in opposition to Nicholas FitzMaurice); died before January 1411; also known as John Artilburch
1408	1450	Nicholas FitzMaurice	Appointed before 17 September 1408; confirmed by Antipope Pope John XXIII 27 January 1411; died before April 1450
1450	1451	Maurice Slack	Appointed 30 January 1450; consecrated after 29 April 1450; died before January 1452
1452	1458	Mauricius Ó Conchobhair	Appointed 26 January 1452; consecrated after 11 February 1452; died before September 1458
1458/88	1488	John Stack	Appointed by Pope Pius II 18 September 1458; consecrated circa 1461; confirmed by Pope Sixtus IV 15 March 1488; died October 1488
1461	1475	John Pigge, O.P.	Appointed by Pope Pius II 27 March 1461; resigned before 22 June 1473; translated to Beirut before 1475; also was rector of St Christopher, Threadneedle Street, London 1462–1483
1473/88	1495	Philip Stack	Appointed by Pope Sixtus IV 26 June 1473, but set aside; provided again by Pope Innocent VIII 27 October 1488; died before November 1495
1495	1536	John FitzGerald	Appointed 20 November 1495; died before May 1536
1536	1583	James FitzMaurice, O.Cist.	Appointed 15 May 1536; papal nominee and recognised by the crown; in a letter of 12 October 1561, the papal legate Fr David Wolfe SJ described all the bishops in Munster as 'adherents of the Queen'; died 1583; also known as James FitzRichard, FitzRichard Pierce or FitzRichard Piers

== Post-Reformation bishops ==
=== Church of Ireland succession ===
Church of Ireland Bishops of Ardfert and Aghadoe
From	Until	Incumbent	Notes
1588	c.1599	Nicholas Kenan	Nominated 26 June 1588; letters patent 22 October 1588; died circa 1599
1600	1621	John Crosbie	Nominated 2 October 1600; letters patent 15 December 1600; died September 1621
1621	1628	John Steere	Translated from Kilfenora; nominated 8 December 1621; letters patent 20 July 1622; died May 1628
1628	1638	William Steere	Nominated 21 July 1628; consecrated October 1628; died 21 January 1638
1641	1661	Thomas Fulwar	Nominated 27 June 1641; consecrated 1641; translated to Cashel 1 February 1661
In 1661, the see became part of the united bishopric of Limerick, Ardfert and Aghadoe

=== Roman Catholic succession ===
Roman Catholic Bishops of Ardfert and Agahdoe
From	Until	Incumbent	Notes
1591	c.1600	Michael Fitzwalter	appointed 9 August 1591; died circa 1600
appointed 1601		Michael Egan	Appointed vicar apostolic to administer the see by papal brief 1 December 1601
c.1611	c.1650	Richard O'Connell	Appointed as vicar apostolic circa 1611 and as bishop 16 September 1641; consecrated 10 June 1643; died circa 1650; also recorded as Rickard O'Connell
appointed 1657		Moriarty O'Brien	Appointed vicar apostolic to administer the see by papal brief 17 April 1657
appointed 1700		Aeneas O'Leyne	Appointed vicar apostolic to administer the see by papal brief 12 March 1700
1720	1739	Denis Moriarty	Appointed 7 March 1720; died February 1739
1739	1743	Eugene O'Sullivan	Appointed 24 April 1739; died 1743
1743	1753	William O'Meara	Appointed in November 1743; translated to Killaloe 23 February 1753
1753	1774	Nicholas Madgett	Translated from Killaloe 23 February 1753; died in August 1774
1775	1786	Francis Moylan	Appointed 8 May 1775; translated to Cork 3 June 1787
1787	1797	Gerard Teehan	Appointed 19 June 1787; died 4 (or 5) July 1797
1798	1824	Charles Sughrue	Appointed 6 February 1798; consecrated 11 June 1798; died 29 September 1824
1824	1856	Cornelius Egan	Appointed coadjutor bishop 4 April and consecrated 25 July 1824; succeeded 29 September 1824; died 22 July 1856
1856	1877	David Moriarty	Appointed coadjutor bishop 18 February and consecrated 25 April 1854; succeeded 22 July 1856; died 1 October 1877
1878	1881	Daniel McCarthy	Appointed 7 June and consecrated 25 August 1878; died 23 July 1881
1881	1889	Andrew Higgins	Appointed 18 December 1881; consecrated 5 February 1882; died 1 May 1889
1889	1904	John Coffey	Appointed 27 August and consecrated 10 November 1889; died 14 April 1904
1904	1917	John Mangan	Appointed 8 July and consecrated 18 September 1904; died 1 July 1917
1917	1927	Charles O'Sullivan	Appointed 10 November 1917; consecrated 27 January 1918; died 29 January 1927
1927	1952	Michael O'Brien	Appointed 9 May and consecrated 24 July 1927; died 4 October 1952
On 20 December 1952, the diocese and bishopric changed its name to Kerry.
