= Nicholas Kenan =

Nicholas Kenan was an Irish Anglican priest in the sixteenth century: he was Bishop of Ardfert and Aghadoe from 1588 to 1599.
