= Thomas Fulwar =

Irish Anglican priest

Thomas Fulwar (Fuller) was an Irish Anglican priest in the seventeenth century.

Fulwar was the son of John Fulwar, the vicar of Stebbing. He is recorded in Alumni Oxonienses as being incorporated from Cambridge in 1645. and chancellor of Cork Cathedral in 1639.

He was Bishop of Ardfert and Aghadoe from 1641 to 1661. During the Commonwealth he is credited with having ordained - in England - nearly 1000 Anglican clergy, the most active of all bishops in this process. In 1661, no doubt as a reward for this service, he became Archbishop of Cashel. Thomas bequeathed money for the manufacture of a new flagon, cup and paten for the cathedral at Cashel and these survive with an inscription to that effect. He died in office on 31 March 1667.

Church of England titles
| Preceded by William Steere | Bishop of Ardfert and Aghadoe; 1641–1661 | Succeeded by Edward Synge; Merged with Limerick |
| Preceded by Archibald Hamilton | Archbishop of Cashel; 1661–1667 | Succeeded by Thomas Price |
