= John (bishop of Ardfert) =

John was an Irish priest in the Diocese of Ardfert and Aghadoe in the 13th-century: he is recorded as Archdeacon of Ardfert in 1664; and as Bishop of Ardfert and Aghadoe from 1265 until his death in 1286.
