= Thomas Price (bishop) =

Welsh bishop

The Most Reverend Thomas Price
- Archbishop of Cashel
- Church: Church of Ireland
- Archdiocese: Cashel
- Appointed: 30 March 1667
- In office: 1667-1685
- Predecessor: Thomas Fulwar
- Successor: Narcissus Marsh
- Previous post: Bishop of Kildare (1661-1667)

Orders
- Consecration: 10 March 1661 by James Margetson

Personal details
- Born: 1599 London, England
- Died: 4 August 1685 (aged 85–86) Cashel, County Tipperary, Kingdom of Ireland
- Denomination: Anglican

Thomas Price (1599–1685) was the Church of Ireland's Archbishop of Cashel.

== Life ==
Price was born in Wales or possibly London, and educated at Trinity College, Dublin, where he graduated B.A. in 1623, M.A. in 1628, and was elected a fellow in 1626. He was ordained by William Bedell, and became archdeacon of Bedell's diocese of Kilmore. He was consecrated bishop of Kildare in Christ Church, Dublin, on 10 March 1661 by the Archbishop of Dublin James Margetson, and was translated to the archbishopric of Cashel on 20 May 1667.

Price followed Bedell on the importance of making the Irish language significant in the established church; he ordained some Irish-speaking ministers, and in 1678 he required service to be read in his cathedral from a folio Gaedhilic prayer-book presented to him by Andrew Sall. He encouraged Sall in his edition of the Irish Testament, and had himself some acquaintance with the Irish language.

Price died at Cashel on 4 August 1685.

== Notes ==
Attribution

This article incorporates text from a publication now in the public domain: Lee, Sidney, ed. (1896). "Price, Thomas (1599-1685)". Dictionary of National Biography. Vol. 46. London: Smith, Elder & Co.
