= Andrew Sall =

Andrew Sall (1624–1682) was an Irish Jesuit, later a convert to the Church of England.

== Early life ==
Born at Cashel, he was educated at the College of St. Omer for the priesthood, and became a Jesuit. From 1652 to 1655 he was rector of the Irish College at Salamanca, and reader in the chair of controversy against heresy there; he was also professor of moral theology.

Sall was then professor of divinity in the colleges of Pampeluna, Palencia, and Tudela, all in the north of Spain. During his residence at Pampeluna he was on good terms with Nicholas French. He took the Jesuit fourth vow at Valladolid, probably in 1657 or 1658. In October 1659 he was at Nantes in France.

== Conversion ==
Sall was provincial superior of the Irish Jesuits in July 1664. He returned to Ireland about 1668. On theological grounds he became an Anglican, after debates with Thomas Price, the Protestant archbishop of Cashel. Rumours of his intended change were in circulation about the beginning of 1674, Sall believed his life to be in danger, and Price with others sent a mounted guard to bring him to the archiepiscopal palace. On 17 May 1674 Sall made a public declaration of his adhesion to the church of England in St. John's Church, Cashel; he admitted that he would probably not have declared himself openly but for Arthur Capell, 1st Earl of Essex's proclamation ordering regular clergy to leave Ireland, based on the proceedings of the English parliament in January 1674.

Sall went to Dublin, where John Free, superior of the Irish jesuits, invited him to a private conference. On 5 July he preached in Christ Church Cathedral, explaining his declaration. He went into residence in Trinity College, Dublin, and was admitted to the degree of D.D.

== Later life ==
In July 1675 Sall went to Oxford, where was created D.D. on 22 June 1676, and lived at first in Wadham College, then in lodgings. He returned to Ireland early in 1680. In 1675 he was presented by the crown to the prebend of Swords in St. Patrick's, Dublin, and in 1676 he was made chancellor of Cashel; given Irish preferments, he was also domestic chaplain to the king. From November 1680 till his death, he lived in Dublin, in Oxmanstown.

Sall's health declined at the beginning of 1682. He died in the evening of 5 April, and was buried in St. Patrick's Cathedral.

== Works ==
Sall published his thesis at Trinity College, Dublin with two main points—that there is salvation outside the Roman church, and that the Church of England way to it is safer than that of Rome. Protestant graduates argued the Catholic side. There were books published against him. One was by J. E. printed at Louvain, and dedicated to Mary of Modena; another was the Doleful Fall of Andrew Sall, by Nicholas French as N. N.; and a third by Ignatius Brown, a Jesuit, who as J. S. In answer Sall published his True Catholic and Apostolic Faith, which was licensed by the vice-chancellor on 23 June 1676, and printed at Oxford.

Sall's published works were:

- A Declaration for the Church of England, Dublin; London, 1674.
- A Sermon preached at Christ Church, Dublin, on Matt. xxiv. 15–18, Dublin, 1874 and 1875. There was a French version, London, 1675. Republished in 1840 by Josiah Allport.
- True Catholic and Apostolic Faith, dedicated to the Earl of Essex, Oxford, 1676. Republished in 1841 by Allport.
- Votum pro pace Christiana, Oxford, 1678, and 1680.
- Ethica sive Moralis Philosophia, Oxford, 1680.

Sall worked on the plan of Robert Boyle, whom he had met in England, for an Irish bible. William Bedell's translation of the Old Testament was in manuscript with Henry Jones, and there was another manuscript from Trinity College. Sall worked over the Bedell manuscript with Paul Higgins (Pól Ó hUiginn), another convert, now at Trinity. A new Irish font was cast, by Joseph Moxon in London. Sall had the help of an Irish scribe Denine, identified as Uilliam Ó Duinnín.

Boyle did not follow all the advice from Sall, who thought Theobald Stapleton's Irish catechism of 1639 was a good model. William Daniel's Irish New Testament was reprinted. By mid-February 1682 some sheets of the Old Testament were ready for the press, and before his death Sall had written a preface influenced by Jansenists. The Old Testament was printed by Narcissus Marsh in 1685, with Sall's preface translated into Irish by Hugh O'Reilly.

== Notes ==
Attribution

This article incorporates text from a publication now in the public domain: Lee, Sidney, ed. (1897). "Sall, Andrew". Dictionary of National Biography. Vol. 50. London: Smith, Elder & Co.
