= Ardfert Cathedral =

Ruined medieval cathedral in Kerry, Ireland

Coordinates: 52.328704°N 9.781703°W

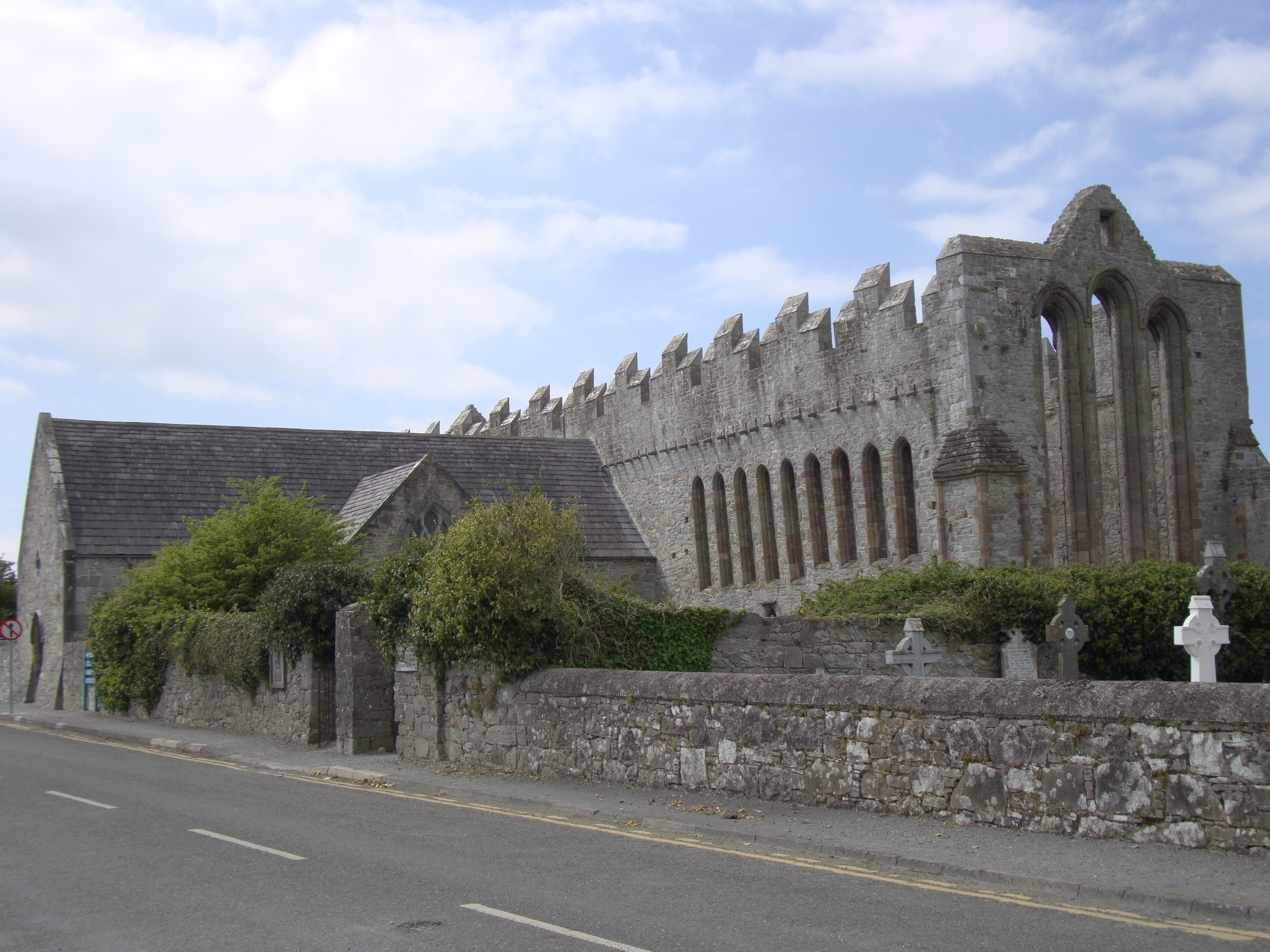
Exterior View of Cathedral

The Ardfert Cathedral (Irish: Ardeaglais Ard Fhearta) is a ruined cathedral in Ardfert, County Kerry, Ireland. Dedicated to Saint Brendan, it was the seat of the Diocese of Ardfert from 1117 to 1663. It is now a heritage tourism site.

== History ==
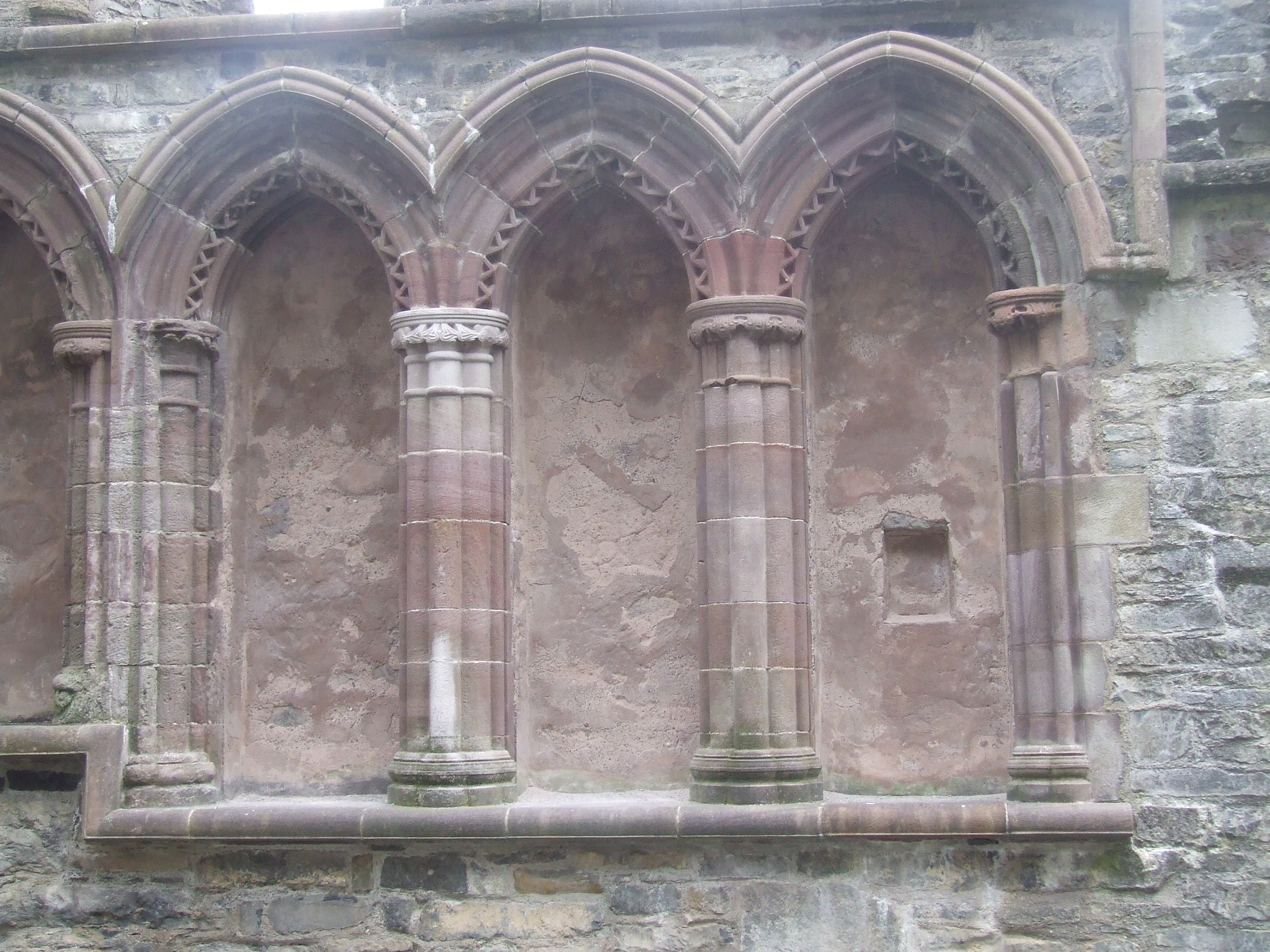
Sedilia at Ardfert Cathedral, August 2015

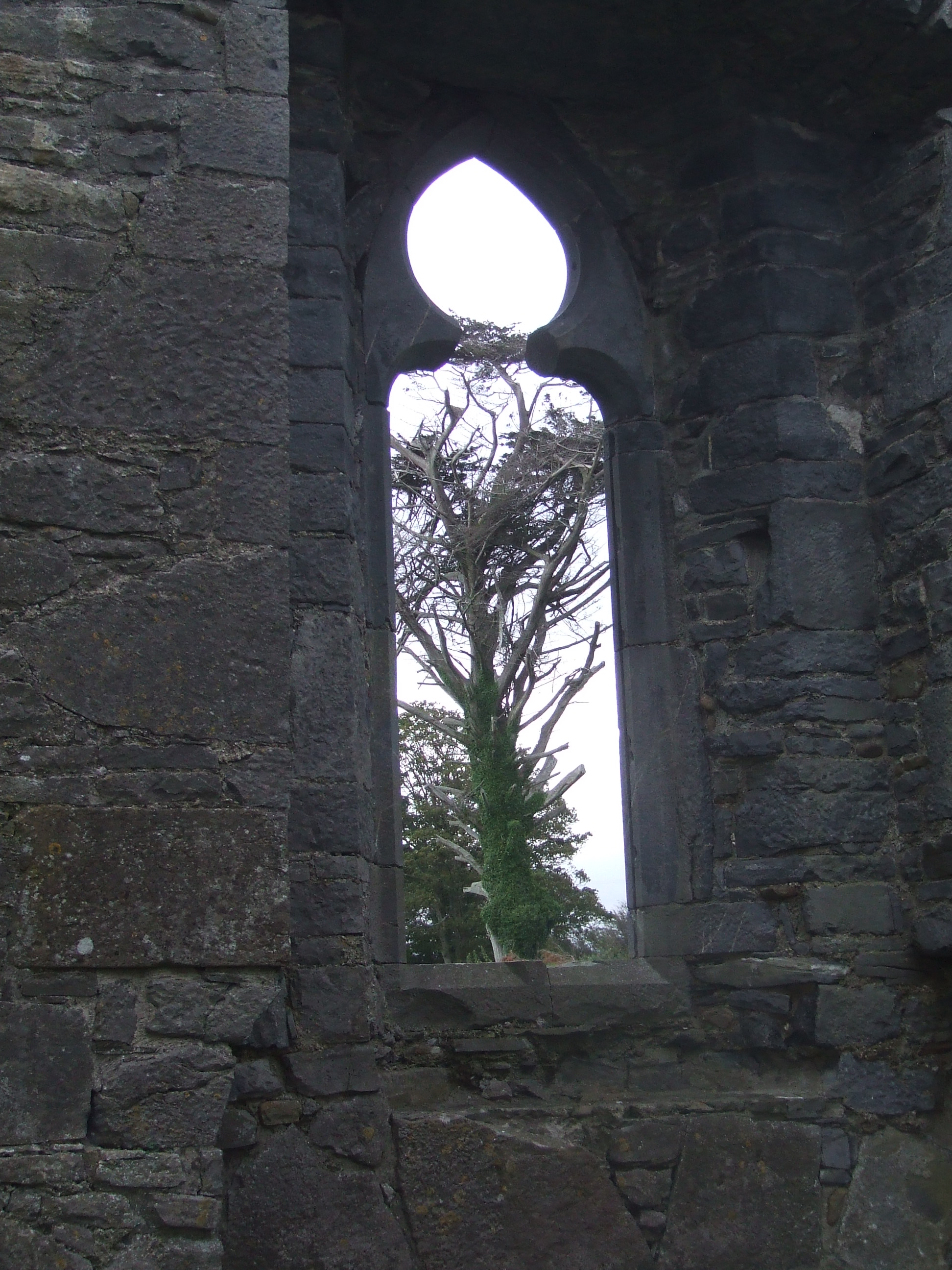
Window in Ardfert friary

Ardfert was the site of a Celtic Christian monastery reputedly founded in the 6th century by Saint Brendan. Although the Synod of Ráth Breasail in 1111 had put the cathedral for Ciarraige at Ratass Church near Tralee, it was moved to Ardfert by 1117. The Diocese later renamed "Ardfert and Aghadoe", although it is unclear whether Aghadoe "Cathedral" ever operated as a separate diocese.

The site has three medieval church ruins, the main and earliest building being from the 12th century. Within the adjoining graveyard there are two other churches, Temple Na Hoe dating from the 12th century and Temple Na Griffin dating from the 15th century. Over 2,000 burials were found when the site was excavated The main church has an ogham stone and a number of early Christian and medieval grave slabs. In the 15th century, a small transept was added and battlements were constructed. During the Reformation in Ireland, the established Church of Ireland became Protestant. The cathedral roof was destroyed during the Irish Rebellion of 1641, but the south transept was re-roofed and extended later in the 17th century. From 1663 the diocese was united with the Diocese of Limerick and the former cathedral became a parish church. In 1871, when a new Church of Ireland church was opened, the cathedral's roof was again removed. After the 1871 disestablishment of the Church of Ireland, its disused historic sites, such as Ardfert Cathedral, were transferred to the Board of Public Works, now the Office of Public Works. Part of the transept has been restored, and houses the entrance and a gift shop.

== See also ==
- Heritage sites (Republic of Ireland)
- Dean of Ardfert List of deans of Ardfert
