= John Steere (bishop) =

Irish Anglican bishop

John Steere was an Anglican bishop in Ireland during the first half of the Seventeenth century.

Formerly Archdeacon of Emly he was consecrated on 26 August 1617 and remained there for five years. He was nominated to the See of Ardfert on 8 December 1621; and appointed with letters patent on 20 July 1622. He died in May 1628.
